= Brain positron emission tomography =

Form of positron emission tomography

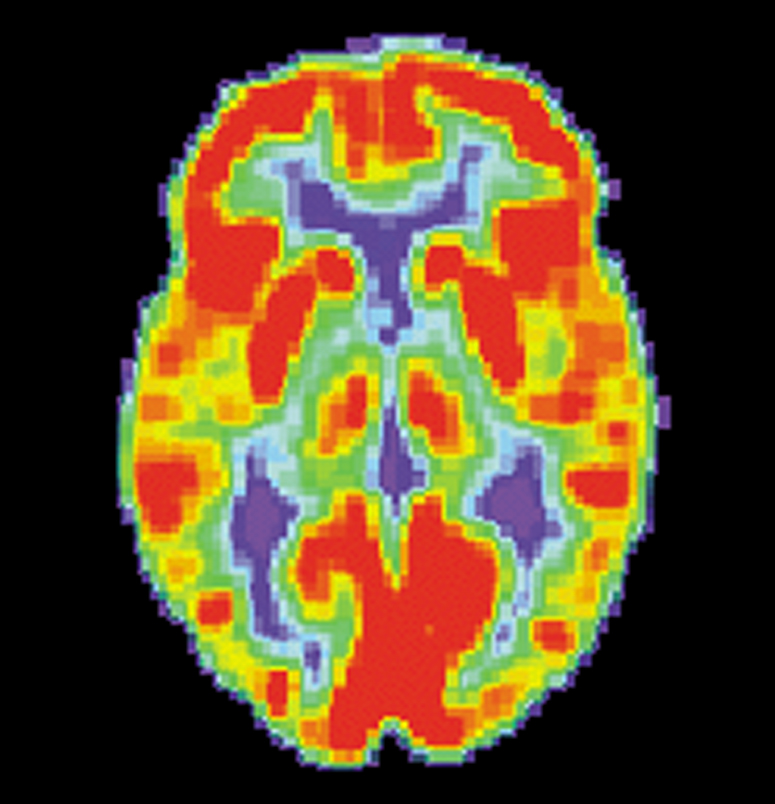
- PET scan of a normal brain
- Synonyms: Neuro-PET
- Purpose: Brain metabolic activity (e.g., glucose metabolism), regional cerebral blood flow, and receptor binding.
- Based on: Positron emission tomography (PET) and radiopharmacology (e.g., using FDG)
- ICD-10-PCS: C030
- MeSH: D000072078

Brain positron emission tomography is a form of positron emission tomography (PET) that is used to measure brain metabolism and the distribution of exogenous radiolabeled chemical agents throughout the brain. PET measures emissions from radioactively labeled metabolically active chemicals that have been injected into the bloodstream. The emission data from brain PET are computer-processed to produce multi-dimensional images of the distribution of the chemicals throughout the brain.

== Process ==
The positron emitting radioisotopes used are usually produced by a cyclotron, and chemicals are labeled with these radioactive atoms. The radioisotopes used in clinics are normally 18F (fluoride), 11C (carbon) and 15O (oxygen). The labeled compound, called a radiotracer or radioligand, is injected into the bloodstream and eventually makes its way to the brain through blood circulation. Detectors in the PET scanner detect the radioactivity as the compound charges in various regions of the brain. A computer uses the data gathered by the detectors to create multi-dimensional (normally 3-dimensional volumetric or 4-dimensional time-varying) images that show the distribution of the radiotracer in the brain following the time. Especially useful are a wide array of ligands used to map different aspects of neurotransmitter activity, with by far the most commonly used PET tracer being a labeled form of glucose, such as FDG.

== Advantages and disadvantages ==
The greatest benefit of PET scanning is that different compounds can show flow and oxygen, and glucose metabolism in the tissues of the working brain. These measurements reflect the amount of brain activity in the various regions of the brain and allow us to learn more about how the brain works. PET scans were superior to all other metabolic imaging methods in terms of resolution and speed of completion (as little as 30 seconds), when they first became available. The improved resolution permitted better study to be made as to the area of the brain activated by a particular task. The biggest drawback of PET scanning is that because the radioactivity decays rapidly, it is limited to monitoring short tasks.

== Uses ==
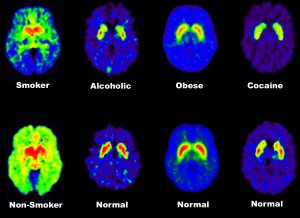
Images obtained with PET (axial sections) that show the effects of chronic drug exposure on various proteins involved in dopamine (DA) neurotransmission and on brain function (as assessed by brain glucose metabolism). While some effects are common to many drugs of abuse,...others are more specific. These include the decrease...in brain monoamine oxidase B (...the enzyme involved in DA metabolism) in cigarette smokers. The rainbow scale was used to code the PET images; radiotracer concentration is displayed from higher to lower as red > yellow > green > blue.

Before the use of functional magnetic resonance imaging (fMRI) became widespread, PET scanning was the preferred method of functional (as opposed to structural) brain imaging, and it still continues to make large contributions to neuroscience. PET scanning is also useful in PET-guided stereotactic surgery and radiosurgery for treatment of intracranial tumors, arteriovenous malformations and other surgically treatable conditions.

PET scanning is also used for diagnosis of brain disease, most notably because brain tumors, strokes, and neurodegenerative diseases (such as Alzheimer's disease and Parkinson's disease) all cause great changes in brain metabolism, which in turn causes detectable changes in PET scans. PET is probably most useful in early cases of certain dementias (with classic examples being Alzheimer's disease and Pick's disease) where the early damage is too diffuse and makes too little difference in brain volume and gross structure to change CT and standard MRI images enough to be able to reliably differentiate it from the "normal" range of cortical atrophy which occurs with aging (in many but not all) persons, and which does not cause clinical dementia.

PET is also actively used for multiple sclerosis and other acquired demyelinating syndromes, but mainly for research into pathogenesis instead of diagnosis. They use specific radioligands for microglial activity. Currently is widely used the 18-kDa translocator protein (TSPO). Also combined PET-CT are sometimes performed.

== Tracer types ==
PET imaging with oxygen-15 indirectly measures blood flow to the brain. In this method, increased radioactivity signal indicates increased blood flow which is assumed to correlate with increased brain activity. Because of its 2-minute half-life, O-15 must be piped directly from a medical cyclotron for such uses, which is difficult.

PET imaging with 18F-FDG takes advantage of the fact that the brain is normally a rapid user of glucose. Standard 18F-FDG PET of the brain measures regional glucose use and can be used in neuropathological diagnosis.

- Example: Brain pathologies such as Alzheimer's disease greatly decrease brain metabolism of both glucose and oxygen in tandem. Therefore 18F-FDG PET of the brain may also be used to successfully differentiate Alzheimer's disease from other dementing processes, and also to make early diagnoses of Alzheimer's disease. The advantage of 18F-FDG PET for these uses is its much wider availability. Some radioactive tracers used for Alzheimer's are florbetapir 18F, flutemetamol F18, PiB and florbetaben 18F, which are all used to detect amyloid plaques, a potential biomarker for Alzheimer's in the brain.
- Examples: PET imaging with FDG can also be used for localization of seizure focus: A seizure focus will appear as hypometabolic during an interictal scan. Several radiotracers (i.e. radioligands) have been developed for PET that are ligands for specific neuroreceptor subtypes such as [^{11}C] raclopride, [^{18}F] fallypride and [^{18}F] desmethoxyfallypride for dopamine D2/D3 receptors, [^{11}C] McN 5652 and [^{11}C] DASB for serotonin transporters, [^{18}F] Mefway for serotonin 5HT1A receptors, [^{18}F] Nifene for nicotinic acetylcholine receptors or enzyme substrates (e.g. 6-FDOPA for the AADC enzyme). These agents permit the visualization of neuroreceptor pools in the context of a plurality of neuropsychiatric and neurologic illnesses.
- Example: PET imaging with 18F-FDG can be used to estimate glucose metabolism in acute ischemic stroke. Some tracers used for ischemic stroke are Oxygen-15 labelled water, [^{18}F]FMISO.

The development of a number of novel probes for noninvasive, in vivo PET imaging of neuroaggregate in the human brain has brought amyloid PET imaging to the doorstep of clinical use. Amyloid imaging uses a PET scan together with a radioactive tracer that binds to amyloid plaques. The scan can provide detailed images of amyloid distribution before the dementia onset. The earliest amyloid imaging probes included 2-(1-{6-[(2-[^{18}F]fluoroethyl)(methyl)amino]-2-naphthyl}ethylidene)malononitrile ([^{18}F]FDDNP) developed at the University of California, Los Angeles and N-methyl-[^{11}C]2-(4'-methylaminophenyl)-6-hydroxybenzothiazole (termed Pittsburgh compound B) developed at the University of Pittsburgh. These amyloid imaging probes permit the visualization of amyloid plaques that help a positive clinical diagnosis of Alzheimer's to be made, and also help in the development of novel anti-amyloid therapies. [^{11}C]PMP (N-[^{11}C]methylpiperidin-4-yl propionate) is a novel radiopharmaceutical used in PET imaging to determine the activity of the acetylcholinergic neurotransmitter system by acting as a substrate for acetylcholinesterase. Post-mortem examination of AD patients have shown decreased levels of acetylcholinesterase. [^{11}C]PMP is used to map the acetylcholinesterase activity in the brain, which could allow for pre-mortem diagnoses of AD and help to monitor AD treatments. Avid Radiopharmaceuticals has developed and commercialized a compound called florbetapir that uses the longer-lasting radionuclide fluorine-18 to detect amyloid plaques using PET scans.

In 2024 Flortaucipir (18F) another PET scan tracer for use in detecting tau protein of the neurofibrillary tangles the second hallmark feature of Alzheimer's, was approved in the US and in Europe.

== Dedicated brain PET devices ==
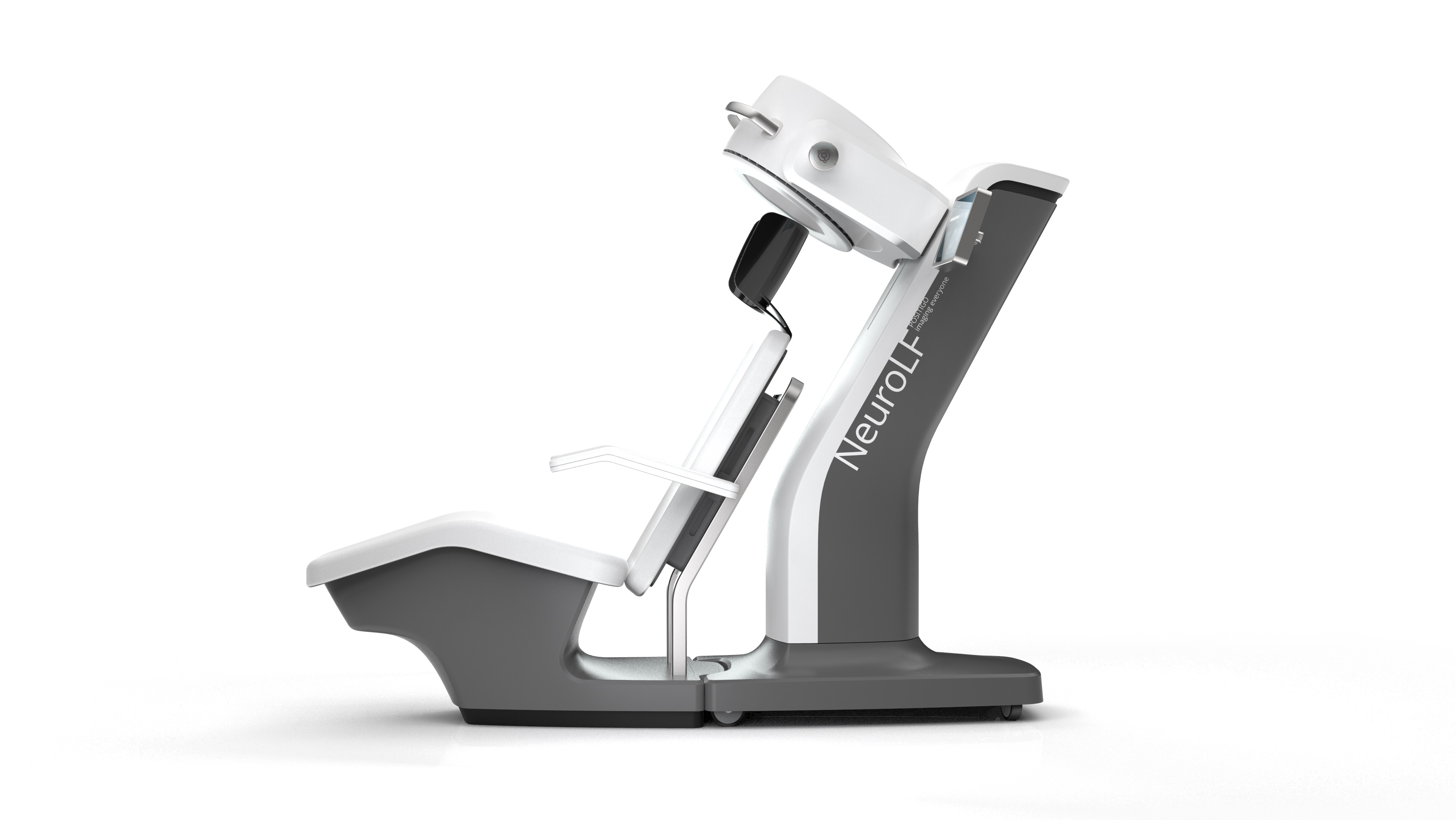
NeuroLF - a dedicated brain PET system. Photo courtesy of Positrigo AG, Switzerland

In 2019 Catana et al. published an overview article about the "Development of Dedicated Brain PET Imaging Devices: Recent Advances and Future Perspectives". Various companies worldwide are working on developing a dedicated brain PET system either for pure research and/or clinical routine use. One of these companies is Positrigo which is working on the NeuroLF system.

== Challenges ==
One main challenge for developing new PET tracers for neuroimaging is that these tracers must cross the blood-brain barrier. Commonly, small molecules which are fat soluble have been used as they can pass the blood-brain barrier through lipid mediated passive diffusion.

However, as pharmaceutics move towards large biomolecules for therapies, new research has also focused on using biomolecules, such as antibodies, for PET tracers. These new larger PET tracers have increased difficulty passing the BBB as they are too large to passively diffuse across. Therefore, recent research is investigating methods to carry biomolecules across the BBB using endogenous transport systems including carrier-mediated transporters such as glucose and amino acid carriers, receptor-mediated transcytosis for insulin or transferrin.
