= List of PET radiotracers =

This is a list of positron emission tomography (PET) radiotracers. These are chemical compounds in which one or more atoms have been replaced by a short-lived, positron emitting radioisotope.

== Cardiology ==
- [^{15}O] water
- [^{13}N] ammonia
- [^{82}Rb] Rubidium-82 chloride
- [^{11}C] Acetate (Also used in oncology)

== Neurology ==
- [^{11}C] 25B-NBOMe (Cimbi-36)
- [^{18}F] Altanserin
- [^{11}C] Carfentanil
- [^{11}C] DASB
- [^{11}C] DTBZ or [^{18}F]Fluoropropyl-DTBZ
- [^{11}C] [^{11}C] ME@HAPTHI
- [^{18}F] Fallypride
- [^{18}F] Florbetaben
- [^{18}F] Flubatine
- [^{18}F] Fluspidine
- [^{18}F] Florbetapir
- [^{18}F] or [^{11}C] Flumazenil
- [^{18}F] Flutemetamol
- [^{18}F] Fluorodopa
- [^{18}F] FTC-146
- [^{18}F] Desmethoxyfallypride
- [^{18}F] Mefway
- [^{18}F] MPPF
- [^{18}F] Nifene
- [^{11}C] Pittsburgh compound B
- [^{11}C] Raclopride
- [^{18}F] Radiocaine
- [^{18}F] Setoperone
- [^{18}F] or [^{11}C] N-Methylspiperone
- [^{11}C] Verapamil

NIMH maintains a list of CNS radiotracers that may be useful for additional information.

=== Neuroepigenetics ===
- [^{11}C] Martinostat

== Oncology ==
- [^{18}F] Fludeoxyglucose (18F) (FDG)-glucose analogue
- [^{11}C] Acetate
- [^{11}C] Methionine
- [^{11}C] choline
- [^{18}F] EF5
- [^{18}F] Fluciclovine
- [^{18}F] Fluorocholine
- [^{18}F] FET
- [^{18}F] FMISO
- [^{18}F] Fluorothymidine F-18
- [^{64}Cu] Cu-ETS2
- [^{64}Cu] Copper-64 DOTA-TATE
- [^{68}Ga] DOTA-pseudopeptides
- [^{68}Ga] DOTA-TATE
- [^{68}Ga] PSMA
- [^{68}Ga] CXCR4; solid and hematologic cancers

== Infectious diseases ==
- [^{18}F] Fluorodeoxysorbitol (FDS)
