= Michel Ter-Pogossian =

American medical physicist (1925–1996)

Michel M. Ter-Pogossian
- Ter-Pogossian in the late 1960s
- Born: April 21, 1925; Berlin, Weimar Republic
- Died: June 19, 1996 (aged 71); Paris, France
- Citizenship: United States
- Education: University of Paris; Institute of Radium; Washington University in St. Louis
- Years active: 1950–1996
- Medical career
- Field: Nuclear medicine, radiology, biomedical sciences
- Institutions: Mallinckrodt Institute of Radiology (Washington University School of Medicine)
- Awards: Canada Gairdner International Award (1993)

Michel Matthew Ter-Pogossian (April 21, 1925 – June 19, 1996) was an Armenian-American medical physicist. He was professor of radiology at the Washington University School of Medicine for over 30 years. A pioneer in nuclear medicine, he is best known for his research on the positron emission tomography (PET). He is considered one of its creators and often referred to as the "father of PET."

== Early life ==
Ter-Pogossian was born on April 21, 1925, in Berlin to Armenian parents from the Ottoman Empire who escaped the Armenian genocide. He was the only child. His family later moved to France, where Ter-Pogossian grew up. He developed an early interest in science and experimented with toy physics and chemistry kits as a child. Ter-Pogossian attended the University of Paris, from which he received his bachelor's degree in mathematics in 1942 or 1943. He subsequently studied at the Institute of Radium under Irène Joliot-Curie, graduating in 1946. He was active in the French Resistance during World War II.

== Career ==
Ter-Pogossian moved to the United States in 1946 to complete his studies. He preferred the U.S. over Britain because the former seemed "more exciting." He enrolled at Washington University in St. Louis as a graduate student in 1946. He was drawn to the university by and studied under Arthur Compton, who was also the university's chancellor at the time. He simultaneously worked in the physics department as a research assistant. Ter-Pogossian received his master's degree in 1948, and his Ph.D. in nuclear physics from WashU in 1950.

He joined the Mallinckrodt Institute of Radiology at WashU in 1950. In the same year he also joined the faculty of Washington University School of Medicine as an instructor in radiation physics. He was named professor of radiation physics in 1961, professor of biophysics in physiology in 1964, and professor of radiation sciences in 1973.

Between 1963 and 1991 Ter-Pogossian served as director of the division of radiation sciences at the Mallinckrodt Institute. (Note: Other sources indicate 1973 as the year he became head of the Division of Radiation Sciences.) After resigning from administrative duties in 1990, Ter-Pogossian devoted all his time to research. He was a self-proclaimed "research junkie". He became emeritus professor in 1995.

== Work ==
Ter-Pogossian spent his entire professional career at Washington University's Mallinckrodt Institute of Radiology. His research focused on "increasing the number of practical clinical applications of cerebral scanning." His work resulted in improvement of medical imaging, radiation therapy, and brachytherapy. He developed a new type of nuclear medicine gamma camera, known as the "Ter-Pogossian camera."

In 1951 Ter-Pogossian developed a pioneering scanner that detected radioactivity concentrations in living material. In the mid-1950s he "reported the first biomedical application of a sodium iodide detector for the diagnosis and localization of intracranial tumors."

=== Positron emission tomography (PET) ===
Ter-Pogossian was a pioneer in the use of cyclotron-produced radioactive tracers. He is best known for his work on the positron emission tomography (PET), and he was the first nuclear medical scientist to use radioactive oxygen-15 in biological studies. His research began in the 1950s with a series of experiments that made PET a "practical diagnostic tool" by the 1970s.

His early work led to the installation of a small biomedical cyclotron in the basement at the Washington University Medical Center in 1963. He persuaded several government agencies to support the research. It was the first cyclotron in the U.S. located in a medical center. The cyclotron produced short-lived, positron-emitting radionuclides intended to be used to develop techniques for measuring regional cerebral blood flow, oxygen metabolism, blood volume, and glucose metabolism. The first PET unit was created in 1974 by the group led by Ter-Pogossian. A decade later, PET units of that design were "used in many medical centers throughout the world."

He wrote a book on diagnostic radiology, which became the field's first textbook.

Ter-Pogossian is recognized to have "led the research that turned the positron emission tomography (PET) scanner from an intriguing concept to a medical tool used in hospitals and laboratories everywhere." With Edward J. Hoffman and Michael E. Phelps "he played a major role turning positron imaging from a laboratory concept into practical imaging protocols and devices that are currently used worldwide."

== Personal life and death ==
Ter-Pogossian married visual artist Ann Dodson (née Scott), of St. Louis, in 1966. Ann (1932–2022) had a master's degree in Egyptology and participated in exhibitions from 1973 to 2003, including the prestigious Florence Biennale. After her marriage to Michel, she signed her work and exhibited under the name Ann Ter-Pogossian. Ann had two sons and a daughter by her first marriage. The Ter-Pogossians were residents of Clayton, Missouri.

Ter-Pogossian was described by Ronald G. Evens as a "citizen of the world." He traveled extensively and was a gourmand and a scuba diver. He died on June 19, 1996, of apparent myocardial infarction in Paris, while on a vacation.

== Recognition ==
Ter-Pogossian was an "internationally known pioneer in the use of cyclotron-produced radionuclides in biomedical research." Frans Wackers noted that he is "widely recognized as one of the fathers of PET imaging." He has been called "the father of PET" by some. Ter-Pogossian emphasized that PET is the product of teamwork and elaborated:

...when somebody referred to me as the father of PET, I said, "I'd rather be the mother of PET, because many offspring have many fathers, and only one mother. As a matter of fact, some offspring have no father at all!" Of course there are many fathers. [...] [it's obvious that] there are masses of fathers of PET. Again, the important point is—I'm not suggesting that to you; it is probably obvious—is again the convergence of so many different disciplines. The development of the scintillation counter, artificial radioactivity, and so on.

=== Awards ===
- Paul C. Aebersold Award, Society of Nuclear Medicine and Molecular Imaging (1976)
- Georg Charles de Hevesy Nuclear Medicine Pioneer Award, Society of Nuclear Medicine and Molecular Imaging (1985)
- Canada Gairdner International Award (1993) "For contributions to the development and application of positron emission tomography"

=== Membership ===
Ter-Pogossian was a member of many professional societies: charter member of the American Nuclear Society, fellow of the American Physical Society, honorary member of the Société Belge de Médecine Nucléaire, honorary fellow of the American College of Radiology, Institute of Medicine (elected in 1987).

He was a trustee of the Academy of Science, St. Louis and served as an adviser to several Department of Energy, National Institutes of Health and Food and Drug Administration committees. He served on the editorial boards of several journals, including the American Journal of Roentgenology, the Journal of Nuclear Medicine, and the Journal de Biophysique & Médecine Nucléaire. He was the first editor of the IEEE Transactions on Medical Imaging, published by the Institute of Electrical and Electronics Engineers.
