= Edward J. Hoffman =

American scientist (1942–2004)

- Born: January 1, 1942
- Died: July 1, 2004 (aged 62); Los Angeles, California, U.S.
- Education: Saint Louis University; Washington University in St. Louis
- Known for: PET scanner
- Scientific career
- Workplaces: Washington University School of Medicine; David Geffen School of Medicine at UCLA

Edward Joseph Hoffman (January 1, 1942 – July 1, 2004) helped invent the first human PET scanner, a commonly used whole-body scanning procedure for detecting diseases like cancer. Hoffman, with Michel Ter-Pogossian and Michael E. Phelps, developed the Positron Emission Tomography scanner in 1973.

Hoffman was born in St. Louis, Missouri. He earned a BS chemistry from Saint Louis University in 1963, his Ph.D. in Nuclear Chemistry from Washington University in St. Louis in 1970. In 1972 he joined the faculty of Washington University School of Medicine, where he and Michael Phelps began developing what later became known as the PET scanner, used to detect cancer, heart disease and other serious illnesses. In 1975, Phelps and Hoffman moved to the University of Pennsylvania.

Starting in 1976, Hoffman was a professor at David Geffen School of Medicine at UCLA in the Departments of Molecular and Medical Pharmacology and Radiological Sciences. In 1999, he authored a book that reviews the biochemical basis of alternative medical treatments for cancer. He served as Editor-in-Chief of the journal IEEE Transactions on Nuclear Science.

He died of liver cancer in Los Angeles.

== Bibliography ==
- Hoffman, EJ (2008) Cancer and the Search for Selective Biochemical Inhibitors, 2nd edition, CRC Press, ISBN 1-4200-4593-8
