= Fluspidine =

Clinical data
- Other names: [^{18}F]-Fluspidine

Identifiers
- IUPAC name: 1'-benzyl-1-(2-(^{17}F)fluoranylethyl)spiro[1H-2-benzofuran-3,4'-piperidine]
- CAS Number: 1355357-60-6
- PubChem CID: 71719166
- ChemSpider: 29397143
- ChEMBL: ChEMBL1939706

Chemical and physical data
- Formula: C_{21}H_{24}FNO
- Molar mass: 325.427 g·mol^{−1}
- 3D model (JSmol): Interactive image
- SMILES: C1CN(CCC12C3=CC=CC=C3C(O2)CC[18F])CC4=CC=CC=C4
- InChI: InChI=InChI=1S/C21H24FNO/c22-13-10-20-18-8-4-5-9-19(18)21(24-20)11-14-23(15-12-21)16-17-6-2-1-3-7-17/h1-9,20H,10-16H2/i22-1; Key:LDFPQKADFLEDQV-KVTPGWOSSA-N

Fluspidine is a fluorine-18 (^{18}F) labeled radiotracer used in positron emission tomography (PET) scans to image σ_{1} (sigma-1) receptors in the brain and other tissues. Sigma-1 receptors are proteins involved in many neurological and psychiatric processes. They have been linked to pain modulation, psychosis, Alzheimer's disease, and depression.

== Chemical properties ==
Fluspidine is a small organic compound with a spirocyclic structure. A 2-fluoroethyl group on the molecule carries the fluorine-18. The compound exists as two mirror image enantiomers, called (R)-fluspidine and (S)-fluspidine. These enantiomers have slightly different properties: (R)-fluspidine has about 4-fold higher affinity for the σ₁ receptor than (S)-fluspidine, but (S)-fluspidine is metabolically more stable in the body.
