= Radiocaine =

- Structural formula of Radiocaine

Identifiers
- IUPAC name: N-(2,6-dimethylphenyl)-2-[ethyl(2-(18F)fluoranylethyl)amino]acetamide
- CAS Number: 2235413-00-8
- PubChem CID: 153316836
- UNII: KJ6WA6AYC5

Chemical and physical data
- Formula: C_{14}H_{21}^{18}FN_{2}O
- Molar mass: 251.34
- 3D model (JSmol): Interactive image
- SMILES: CCN(CC[18F])CC(=O)NC1=C(C=CC=C1C)C
- InChI: InChI=InChI=1S/C14H21FN2O/c1-4-17(9-8-15)10-13(18)16-14-11(2)6-5-7-12(14)3/h5-7H,4,8-10H2,1-3H3,(H,16,18)/i15-1; Key:NLNDMDUJSHQLQA-HUYCHCPVSA-N

Radiocaine ([18F]-fluorolidocaine) is a fluorine-18 (^{18}F) labeled radiotracer designed for positron emission tomography (PET) imaging of voltage-gated sodium channels (NaVs), particularly the SCN5A isoform, which is predominant in cardiac tissue. It is being explored for its potential in diagnosing and monitoring cardiac and neurological diseases through quantification of NaVs.

Radiocaine is a structural analog of lidocaine, a class Ib antiarrhythmic agent. The only difference is the presence of a fluorine-18 isotope at the terminus of one ethyl chain.

== Development ==
Radiocaine was developed to enable non-invasive imaging of NaVs, which play an important role in generating and propagating action potentials in excitable tissues such as the heart and nervous system. It is valuable for studying the SCN5A isoform, the primary voltage-gated sodium channel in the heart, and NaVs expressed in peripheral nerves.

A Phase 1 clinical trial began in June 2025 to evaluate Radiocaine's safety, biodistribution, and radiation dosimetry in healthy volunteers.
