= Metabolic trapping =

Metabolic trapping refers to a localization mechanism of synthesized radiocompounds in the human body. It can be defined as the intracellular accumulation of a radioactive tracer based on the relative metabolic activity of the body's tissues. It is a basic principle of the design of radiopharmaceuticals as metabolic probes for functional studies or tumor location.

Metabolic trapping is the mechanism underlying the (PET) scan, an effective tool for detecting tumors, as there is a greater uptake of the target molecule by tumor tissue than by normal tissue.

In order to use it as a diagnostic tool in medicine, scientists have studied the trapping of radioactive molecules within different tissues throughout the body. In 1978, Gallagher et al. studied glucose tagged with Fluorine-18 (F-18) to see how it metabolized in the tissues of different organs. This group studied how long it took the lungs, liver, kidneys, heart, and brain to metabolize radioactive glucose. They found the molecule distributed uniformly, and then, after two hours, only the heart and the brain had significant levels of radioactivity from the F-18 due to metabolic trapping. This trapping occurred because once the glucose was pulled into the cells, the glucose was phosphorylated to cause the concentration of glucose in the cell to appear lower than it is, which then promotes the transport of more glucose. This phosphorylation of the radioactive glucose caused the metabolic trapping in the heart and the brain. The lungs, liver, and kidneys did not experience metabolic trapping, and the radioactive glucose that was not trapped was excreted in the urine. F-18 radiolabeled glucose did not get collected by the kidneys and cycled back into the system, as it would do for normal glucose. This suggests that the active transporter requires the hydroxyl (-OH) group found on the C-2 position of the sugar, where the F-18 atom was placed. Without the active transport, the radiolabeled glucose that was not trapped was then excreted as waste instead of being phosphorylated in the cell.

A 2001 study of metabolic trapping used choline derivatives, which were synthesized using F-18, to label prostate cancer. The experiments were conducted first in mice and then in human patients. Choline (CH) and choline radiolabeled with F-18 (FCH) were both found to primarily migrate to the kidneys and liver in their experiment. This is different from the earlier experiment with glucose due to the difference in mechanism and metabolic need of glucose versus choline in the body. Phosphorylation was again found to be responsible for the trapping of the tracer in the tissues.

== See also ==
- Metabolic imprinting
