= Santiago Medina =

Colombian-American sculptor (born 1964)

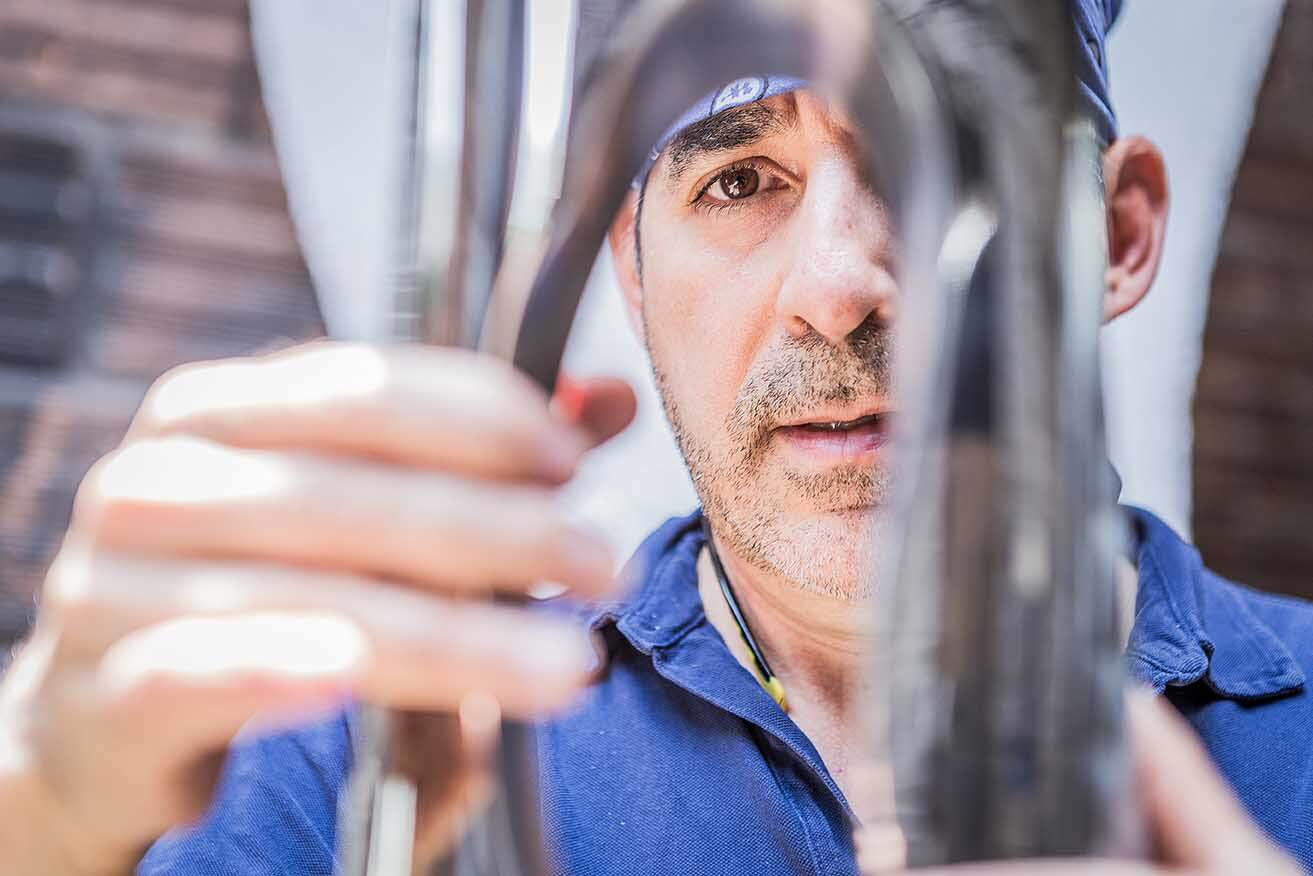
- Medina in 2015
- Born: 21 April 1964 (age 62); Medellín, Colombia
- Education: CES University
- Occupations: Sculptor, doctor
- Website: medinafineart.com

Santiago Medina (born 21 April 1964) is a Colombian-American sculptor. His career spans art, medicine, medical imaging, medical research, and education.

Medina is best known for his stainless steel sculptures – both outdoor monumental and indoor smaller works. He uses advanced medical imaging technology and software to design and create his sculpture, which have included commissions for institutions such as Harvard University School of Public Health, Washington University in St. Louis, Tufts University, Florida International University, CES University in Colombia, Miami Children's Hospital, St. Louis Catholic Church in Miami, Santa Maria de los Angeles Church (Colombia), Monasterio de la Santa Madre Laura (Colombia), and Ransom Everglades School in Miami.

Medina's works are in galleries and private collections throughout the world, and have been shown at major international exhibitions including Art Basel Week Red Dot Fair in Miami, Palm Beach International Art Fair, Arte America (Miami, United States), Miami International Art Fair (MIA), Sincronia Feria de Arte (Bogotá, Colombia), and the Biltmore Hotel in Coral Gables.

== Early life ==
Medina was born and raised in Medellín, Colombia, to a family of artists and physicians. His great-grandfather Emiliano Mejia was a pioneer photographer and painter in Colombia in the late 1800s and early 1900s. His grandfather, Rafael Mejia Uribe, was also a painter and prominent pediatrician in Colombia. He was the first director of Clinica Noel in the 1920s, a pediatric charity hospital in Medellín.

== Physician ==
Inspired by the dual careers of Russian painter and lawyer Wassily Kandinsky and of his grandfather Rafael Mejia as a physician and artist he embarked on doing medicine and art as complementary careers. He decided to specialize in Radiology (Medical Imaging) because of its artistic 3D visual appeal and ground-breaking technology. He did his Diagnostic Radiology (Medical Imaging) residency at the Mallinckrodt Institute of Radiology, Washington University in St. Louis, US. He then subspecialized in Neuroradiology (Brain imaging) and Pediatric Radiology (Medical Imaging in Children) at Boston Children's Hospital a Harvard School of Medicine affiliated Hospital. Looking to bring a social meaning to his medical and artist work he enrolled in the Harvard School of Public Health to do a Master of Public Health with a concentration in Health Care Management. He then went ahead to become a leader in Evidence-based medicine in medical Imaging. He and co-editor Craig Blackmore, MD, MPH went on the publish in 2006, the first-ever book on Evidence-Based Imaging and subsequently with Kimberly Applegate, MD, MS a series on this topic including dedicated adult, pediatric and neuroimaging books. He has co-authored more than 50 peer review articles in major international medical journals including Pediatrics, Radiology, Neurology, American Journal of Neuroradiology and Pediatric Radiology.

== Sculptor ==
Among his most important exhibitions during his career are 2006 Colombia Consulate in Miami, US; 2011 and 2014 Art Basel Week Red Dot Fair, 2013 and 2014 Palm Beach International Art Fair, Biltmore Hotel Coral Gables Solo Exhibitions (2010, 2011 and 2014), 2012 Arte America, 2013 Houston Art Fair, Miami International Art MIA Fair (2013, 2014), Sculpt Miami (2013,2014) and Sinfonia Art Fair Bogotá (2014).

== World wide sculptures and art ==
- Harvard University Chen School of Public Health. Boston, US. Monumental Stainless Steel Sculpture "Life" commemorating the first Centennial of the School. 2014
- Harvard University Chen School of Public Health. Boston, US. Permanent Bronze Sculpture "Maternal Love". 2011
- Stanford University Children's Hospital. Permanent Stainless Steel Sculpture "Dreams". Palo Alto, California, US.
- Ritz Carlton Hotel, Presidential Suite "Pandora" Permanent Monumental Stainless Steel Sculpture. Mexico City, Mexico.
- City of Miami Village of Pinecrest, US. Permanent Monumental Stainless Steel Sculpture "Peace" at Circle of 72 Avenue and 98 Street. 2018
- Historic Pinecrest Botanical Garden, Miami, US. Permanent Monumental Stainless Steel Sculpture "Friendship". Miami 2017
- Museum CES Medina. Permanent Monumental Sculpture at the Plaza of Nirvana. Sculpture and Plaza design, execution and concept by artist. Completed Spring 2018. Medellín, Colombia.
- Boca Raton Hospital. Christine E. Lynn Women's Health & Wellness Institute. Florida Atlantic University. Permanent Monumental Stainless Steel Sculpture "Reflection". Boca Raton, Florida, US.
- Historic Pinecrest Botanical Garden, Miami, US. Permanent Monumental Stainless Steel Sculpture "Eternity". Miami 2020
- Washington University School of Medicine Mallinckrodt Institute of Radiology. St. Louis, US. Permanent Monumental Italian Stainless Steel and Rusted Steel. 2021.
- Historic Biltmore Hotel, Monumental Sculpture "Life". Main Lobby. Coral Gables, US, 2014-2016
- Washington University School of Medicine Becker Library. St. Louis, US. Permanent Bronze Sculpture "Ecstasy". 2012.
- Washington University School of Medicine Farrell Learning and Teaching Center. St. Louis, US. Permanent Bronze Sculpture "Lovers". 2015.
- Boston University. Monumental Stainless Steel Sculpture "Eternity". Expected opening Winter 2018. Boston, US. 2018
- Tufts University Tisch Library. Greater Boston (Somerville), US. Permanent Stainless Steel Sculpture "Infinity".
- Miami Nicklaus Children's Hospital. Permanente Monumental Stainless Steel Sculpture "Peace". Miami, US.
- Florida International University College of Medicine. Miami, US. Permanent Bronze sculpture "Excellence" a tribute to the first graduating class of the physician from the FIU College of Medicine. 2012.
- Florida International University College of Medicine. Miami, US. Permanent Monumental Sculpture Mirage. Sculpture and Plaza design, execution and concept by artist. 2018.
- Miami Country Day School. Commissioned Monumental Stainless Steel Sculpture "Wisdom". Commemorating the exclusive 1937 Society. Plaza Colombia, Miami, US, 2015
- Baptist Hospital South Beach, Miami US. Permanent Monumental Sculpture Blue Eternity. 2019.
- The Parker Company. Headquarters. Stainless Steel Sculpture "Volare". Miami, US. 2013
- The Parker Company. Headquarters. Permanent Monumental Stainless Steel Sculpture "Eternity". Miami, US. 2018
- Belship Company Norway & Sweden. Monumental Stainless Steel Sculpture "Sigh". Sweden. 2015
- Leonisa Internacional. Monumental Stainless Steel Sculpture "Liberty". Medellín, Colombia. 2012
- Florida International University College of Medicine. Miami, US. Permanent Oil and Charcoal painting "Hope". 2011.
- Florida International University College of Medicine. Miami, US. Permanent Oil and Charcoal painting "Enlightment". 2011.
- Echo Aventura Luxury Condominiums. Permanente Monumental Stainless Steel Sculpture "Peace". Project with renown architect Carlos Ott. Miami- Aventura, US.
- Miami Nicklaus Children's Hospital. Miami, US. Permanent Oil and Charcoal painting "Inner Strength" 2009.
- Miami Nicklaus Children's Hospital. Miami, US. Permanent Oil painting "Amistad" installed at the CEO Office of the hospital. 2011.
- Ramson Everglades School. Miami, US. Permanent Oil and Charcoal painting "Help". 2011.
- Santa Maria de Los Angeles Church. Medellín, Colombia. Commissioned painting "Jesus Passion" 2008.
- St. Louis Catholic Church. Miami, US. Commissioned painting "Resurrection" 2013.
- St. Louis Catholic Church. Miami, US. Commissioned painting "Faith" 2014.
- Monastery Saint Mother Laura. Commissioned oil painting "Saint Laura of Colombia" 2015.
- Monastery Saint Mother Laura. Commissioned oil painting "Saint John Paul II" 2012.

== Museum exhibitions and permanent collections ==
- Coral Springs Museum of Art. Sculpture Blue Seduction incorporated into the Permanent Museum Collection in 2019. Coral Springs, US.
- Nutibara Sculpture Museum Park. Monumental Stainless Steel Sculpture "Life" July to September 2013.
- CES University Contemporary Art Museum. Stainless Steel Sculpture "Nirvana" incorporated Permanent Collection. Medellín, Colombia 2016.
- CES University Contemporary Art Museum. Permanent Collection Oil and Charcoal painting "Leonardo da Vinci, the Universal Man". Medellín, Colombia. 2013.
- CES University Contemporary Art Museum. Permanent Collection Oil painting "Imagine, a Tribute to John Lennon". Medellín, Colombia. Medellín, Colombia. 2013.
- CES University Contemporary Art Museum. Solo Exhibition "Interactive Steel". Medellín, Colombia 2016.
- Museo de la República Colombia. Sculpture Resilience. Given to President Ivan Duque from Colombia durante the dedication of the Colombian Sculpture Gardens at South Miami, US.

== Large international solo exhibitions ==
- Historical Pinecrest Gardens. Solo Monumental Stainless Steel Exhibition "Interactive Steel". October 2016-March 2017. Pinecrest. Miami. US.
- CES University Contemporary Museum. Solo Stainless Steel Sculpture Exhibition "Steel to the Infinite". April to May 2018. Pinecrest. Miami. US.
- Historical Club Campestre. Solo Monumental Stainless Steel Exhibition "Interactive Steel". August 2016. Pinecrest. Medellín, Colombia.
- Club Llanogrande. Solo Monumental Stainless Steel Exhibition "Interactive Steel". July 2016. Pinecrest. Medellín, Colombia.
- Colombia Consulate in Miami, US. Solo Exhibition.
- Solo Exhibitions at the Historical Biltmore Hotel in Coral Gables, US.
