= Ann Ter-Pogossian =

American painter

- Born: Ann Garrison Scott; July 13, 1932; St. Louis, Missouri
- Died: April 17, 2022 (aged 90); St. Louis, Missouri
- Known for: Oil Painting
- Awards: Lorenzo il Magnifico Lifetime Achievement Award
- Website: Ann Dodson Ter-Pogossian Art

Ann Ter-Pogossian (July 13, 1932 - April 17, 2022), was an American oil painter who exhibited in the United States, England, Spain, France, and Italy. Works included landscapes, still lifes, portraits, figures in motion, and commentaries on current events. One review described her work as using "knowledge of the great artistic movements of the past … to re-evaluate and reinterpret familiar themes concerning the problems of figures in movement, perspective and iconography." A common theme in later works is the roles of women in society.

She was born and spent most of her life around St. Louis, Missouri, but also resided in Liberty Corner, New Jersey. Some of her early works document and interpret the history and development of downtown St. Louis.

Her later works are signed Ann Ter-Pogossian, but other signatures include Ann Scott, Ann Scott Dodson, Ann Dodson, ATP, and ANN.

== Education ==
- Bachelor of Fine Arts, Washington University in St. Louis (now housed under the Sam Fox School of Design & Visual Arts) She studied under Warner Trivis and Fred Conway.
- Master's degree in Egyptology, Washington University in St. Louis, Missouri. Key paper: "African Tribes as Represented in Egyptian Art."

== Selected exhibitions ==
- City Art Museum of St. Louis, St. Louis (now Saint Louis Art Museum) 1955, 1961, 1964
- Gallerie de la Tournell Paris (solo), France, 1973
- Missouri Botanical Garden, 1979
- Viridian Gallery, New York, 1988 (solo)
- Ariel Gallery, New York, 1989
- Boody Fine Arts, MetLife Building, 1991 (solo)
- Biennale Internazionale Dell'Arte Contemporanea, Florence, 2003
- Biennale Internazionale Dell'Arte Contemporanea, Florence, 2005
- Amsterdam-Whitney Gallery, New York, 2008-2012

== Awards ==
Lorenzo il Magnifico Lifetime Achievement Award, Biennale Internazionale Dell'Arte Contemporanea, 2003

== Personal life ==
Ann had two sons and a daughter by her marriage to Rowland Wheeler Dodson Jr (1927 – 1964). After Rowland's death, she married pioneering nuclear medicine physicist Michel Ter-Pogossian of St. Louis in 1966. The couple were residents of Clayton, Missouri.

Ann and Michel traveled extensively and were gourmets, scuba divers, and big-game hunters. Michel died on June 19, 1996, of apparent myocardial infarction in Paris, where the couple were vacationing.

Ann loved entertaining at her home, filled with antiques and artworks, and served gourmet meals with fine wine. In her later years, Ann knitted thousands of colourful hats, which were donated to hospitals and shelters, and distributed to family members.
