= MPPF =

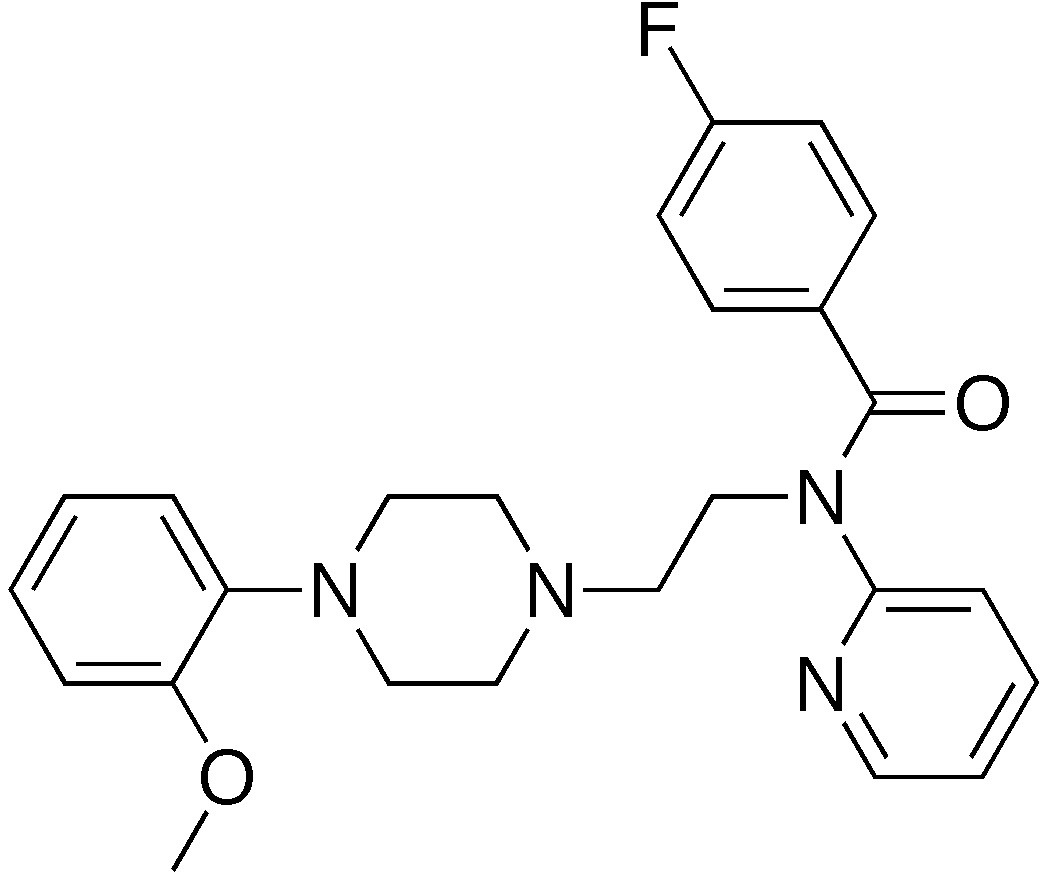

Names
- Preferred IUPAC name 4-Fluoro-N-{2-[4-(2-methoxyphenyl)piperazin-1-yl]ethyl}-N-(pyridin-2-yl)benzamide

Identifiers
CAS Number	155204-26-5
3D model (JSmol)	Interactive image
ChemSpider	5036223
IUPHAR/BPS	81
PubChem CID	6603915
UNII	81KHI46E5L
CompTox Dashboard (EPA)	DTXSID20424966
- InChI: InChI=1S/C25H27FN4O2/c1-32-23-7-3-2-6-22(23)29-17-14-28(15-18-29)16-19-30(24-8-4-5-13-27-24)25(31)20-9-11-21(26)12-10-20/h2-13H,14-19H2,1H3 Key: YJZYDPRMWYWYCG-UHFFFAOYSA-N; InChI=1/C25H27FN4O2/c1-32-23-7-3-2-6-22(23)29-17-14-28(15-18-29)16-19-30(24-8-4-5-13-27-24)25(31)20-9-11-21(26)12-10-20/h2-13H,14-19H2,1H3 Key: YJZYDPRMWYWYCG-UHFFFAOYAQ
- SMILES: COC1=CC=CC=C1N2CCN(CC2)CCN(C3=CC=CC=N3)C(=O)C4=CC=C(C=C4)F

Properties
Chemical formula	C_{25}H_{27}FN_{4}O_{2}
Molar mass	434.51 g/mol
- Except where otherwise noted, data are given for materials in their standard state (at 25 °C [77 °F], 100 kPa). verify (what is ?) Infobox references

MPPF, with the full name 2'-methoxyphenyl-(N-2'-pyridinyl)-p-fluoro-benzamidoethyipiperazine, is a compound that binds to the serotonin-1A receptor. Labeled with fluorine-18 it has been used as a radioligand with positron emission tomography. It has, e.g., been used to examine the difference in neuroreceptor binding in the human brain across sex and age.

== See also ==
- WAY-100,635
