= Pittsburgh compound B =

Names
- Preferred IUPAC name 2-{4-[(^{11}C)Methylamino]phenyl}-1,3-benzothiazol-6-ol
- Other names PiB

Identifiers
| CAS Number | 566170-04-5 |
| 3D model (JSmol) | Interactive image |
| ChemSpider | 2104829 |
| PubChem CID | 2826731 |
| UNII | 7P55415B0R |
| CompTox Dashboard (EPA) | DTXSID00205194 |
- InChI: InChI=1S/C14H12N2OS/c1-15-10-4-2-9(3-5-10)14-16-12-7-6-11(17)8-13(12)18-14/h2-8,15,17H,1H3/i1-1 Key: ZQAQXZBSGZUUNL-BJUDXGSMSA-N; InChI=1/C14H12N2OS/c1-15-10-4-2-9(3-5-10)14-16-12-7-6-11(17)8-13(12)18-14/h2-8,15,17H,1H3/i1-1 Key: ZQAQXZBSGZUUNL-BJUDXGSMEE
- SMILES: [11CH3]NC1=CC=C(C=C1)C2=NC3=C(S2)C=C(C=C3)O

Properties
| Chemical formula | C_{14}H_{12}N_{2}OS |
| Molar mass | 256.32 g·mol^{−1} |
- Except where otherwise noted, data are given for materials in their standard state (at 25 °C [77 °F], 100 kPa). verify (what is ?) Infobox references

Pittsburgh compound B (PiB) is a radioactive analog of thioflavin T, which can be used in positron emission tomography scans to image beta-amyloid plaques in neuronal tissue. Due to this property, Pittsburgh compound B may be used in investigational studies of Alzheimer's disease.

== History ==
The definitive diagnosis of Alzheimer's disease can only be made following the demonstration of the presence of beta-amyloid (Aβ) plaques and neurofibrillary tangles, the pathologic hallmarks of Alzheimer's disease in brain tissue, typically at autopsy. While the cognitive impairments of the disease could be monitored throughout the disease course, clinicians had no reliable way to monitor the pathologic progression of the disease. Due to this fact, a clear understanding of the process of amyloid deposition and how amyloid deposits relate to the cognitive symptoms of Alzheimer's disease remains to be elucidated. While sophisticated centers for the treatment of Alzheimer's disease are able to diagnose the disease with some reliability based on its clinical presentation, the differential diagnosis of Alzheimer's disease from other dementias is less robust. Furthermore, as novel disease-modifying therapies for Alzheimer's disease that attack and remove beta-amyloid deposits from the brain enter clinical trials, a pre-mortem tool for assessing their effectiveness at clearing the amyloid deposits was a much needed development.

To answer these needs, a research team from the University of Pittsburgh led by geriatrics psychiatrist William E. Klunk and radiochemist Chester A. Mathis synthesised charge-neutral benzothiazoles derived from thioflavin T, which included a small number of compounds with suitable properties for use as a positron emission tomography imaging agent. One of these compounds, 2-(4'-[^{11}C]methylaminophenyl)-6-hydroxybenzothiazole, was tested in human subjects. The University of Pittsburgh team partnered with a team of researchers from Uppsala University in Uppsala, Sweden, to conduct the first trials of this new agent in human research subjects. As this was the second investigational compound of this class sent to Uppsala from the University of Pittsburgh group, it was termed simply Pittsburgh compound-B by the Swedish team, who also abbreviated it as "PiB".

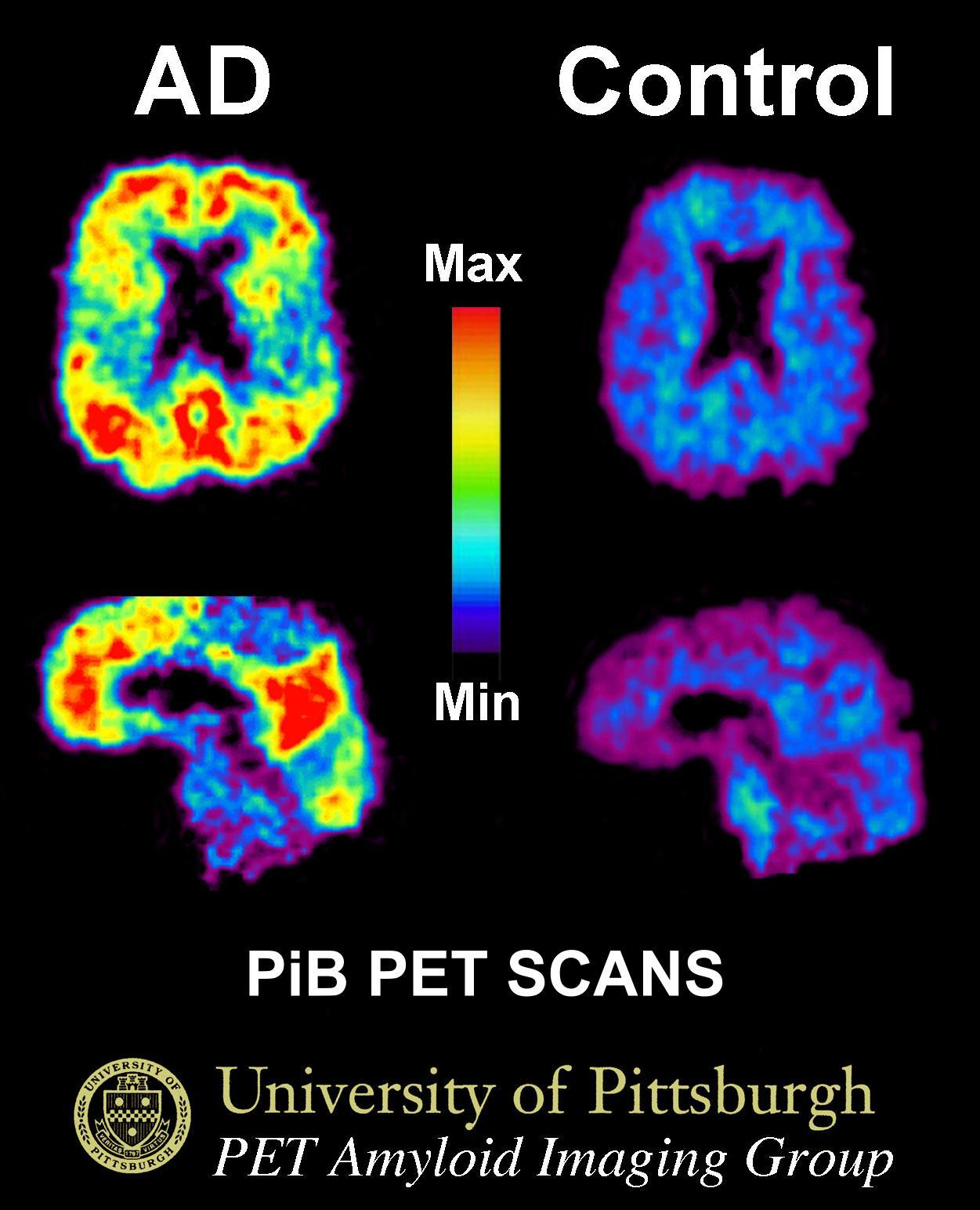
This image shows a PiB-PET scan of a patient with Alzheimer's disease on the left and an elderly person with normal memory on the right. Areas of red and yellow show high concentrations of PiB in the brain and suggest high amounts of amyloid deposits in these areas.

The first PiB study of a human subject with a clinical diagnosis of Alzheimer's disease was conducted by Henry Engler in February, 2002, at Uppsala University. PET scans showed that the compound was retained in areas of the cerebral cortex known to contain significant amyloid deposits from post-mortem examinations. The initial human study of PiB was expanded to include 16 Alzheimer's disease subjects and 9 cognitively normal controls, the report of which was published in 2004 in the Annals of Neurology.

Since that initial study, PiB has been adopted as a research tool by other research institutions. In addition, GE Healthcare is pursuing the development of a clinical diagnostic agent based on PiB for assessing brain amyloidosis.

== Alzheimer's disease research ==
^{11}C-PiB is currently the most studied and used radioligand for PET imaging of cerebral Aβ pathology. This technique has been implicated in Alzheimer's disease research whereby scientists involved in this field are able to perform noninvasive in vivo neuroimaging studies using PET scans in brains of individuals with various degrees of dementia. The ^{11}C-Pittsburgh compound B (^{11}C-PiB) radiotracer is used to measure regional ^{11}C-PiB binding retention rates, thus allowing for the visual and quantitative measurement of Aβ deposition. ^{11}C-PiB is a fluorescent derivative of thioflavin T which preferentially targets and binds to fibrillar Aβ forms found in dense core plaques with high affinity and specificity. In particular, it specifically binds to Aβ_{40} and Aβ_{42} fibrils and insoluble plaques containing the aforementioned Aβ peptides. PiB does not bind with great affinity to soluble or nonfibrillar Aβ plaques until plaques have reached a crucial magnitude, which has yet to be determined. Furthermore, this radiotracer does not bind to neurofibrillary tangles (NFTs) in the neuronal regions of the brain during postmortem autopsies. A typical injected dose ranges from 250 to 450 MBq and the imaging time normally varies between 40 and 90 minutes. The quantification of ^{11}C-PiB has demonstrated to elicit a profound difference in neuronal cortical binding between individuals recognized with Alzheimer's disease and age-matched cognitively normal controls.

== Published clinical research studies ==
| Year | Title | Summary | Authors | Journal |
|---|---|---|---|---|
| 2004 | Imaging brain amyloid in Alzheimer's disease with Pittsburgh Compound-B | Retention of [C-11]PiB shown to be approximately 2-fold greater in cortical areas of AD subjects relative to controls. Pattern of retention mirrors the pattern of amyloid deposition known from post-mortem studies. | Klunk, W.E., H. Engler, A. Nordberg, Y. Wang, G. Blomqvist, D.P. Holt, M. Bergstrom, I. Savitcheva, G.F. Huang, S. Estrada, B. Ausen, M.L. Debnath, J. Barletta, J.C. Price, J. Sandell, B.J. Lopresti, A. Wall, P. Koivisto, G. Antoni, C.A. Mathis, and B. Langstrom | Ann Neurol 55:306-19 |
| 2005 | Kinetic modeling of amyloid binding in humans using PET imaging and Pittsburgh Compound-B. | Methodology paper describing appropriate methods for the quantification of PiB brain scans. First report using PiB in subjects categorized with mild cognitive impairment (MCI). | Price, J.C., W.E. Klunk, B.J. Lopresti, X. Lu, J.A. Hoge, S.K. Ziolko, D.P. Holt, C.C. Meltzer, S.T. DeKosky, and C.A. Mathis | J Cereb Blood Flow Metab 25: 1528-1547 |
| 2009 | Amyloid deposition is associated with impaired default network function in older persons without dementia | In vivo amyloid imaging to demonstrate that high levels of amyloid deposition are associated with aberrant default network functional magnetic resonance imaging (fMRI) activity in asymptomatic older individuals. | Sperling R.A., LaViolette P.S., O'Keefe K, O'Brien J, Rentz D.M., Pihlajamaki M, Marshall G, Hyman B.T., Selkoe D.J., Hedden T, Buckner R.L., Becker J.A., Johnson K.A. | Neuron 63: 178-188 |

== See also ==
- Florbetapir
- Florbetaben
- Flutemetamol
- Tafamidis
- List of PET radiotracers
