= Florbetapir (18F) =

Chemical compound

Florbetapir (^{18}F)

Clinical data
- Pronunciation: /flɔːrˈbeɪtəpɪər/ flor-BAY-tə-peer
- Trade names: Amyvid
- Other names: ^{18}F-AV-45, florbetapir-fluorine-18, Florbetapir F 18 (USAN US)
- AHFS/Drugs.com: Micromedex Detailed Consumer Information
- License data: US DailyMed: Florbetapir
- Routes of administration: Intravenous
- ATC code: V09AX05 (WHO)

Legal status
- Legal status: US: ℞-only; EU: Rx-only

Identifiers
- IUPAC name: 4-[(E)-2-(6-{2-[2-(2-(^{18}F)Fluoroethoxy)ethoxy]ethoxy}pyridin-3-yl)ethen-1-yl]-N-methylaniline
- CAS Number: 956103-76-7
- PubChem CID: 24822371
- IUPHAR/BPS: 7344
- ChemSpider: 26348452
- UNII: 6W15Z5R0RU
- KEGG: D09617
- CompTox Dashboard (EPA): DTXSID80241898

Chemical and physical data
- Formula: C_{20}H_{25}^{18}FN_{2}O_{3}
- Molar mass: 359 g·mol^{−1}
- 3D model (JSmol): Interactive image
- SMILES: CNC1=CC=C(C=C1)/C=C/C2=CN=C(C=C2)OCCOCCOCC[18F]
- InChI: InChI=1S/C20H25FN2O3/c1-22-19-7-4-17(5-8-19)2-3-18-6-9-20(23-16-18)26-15-14-25-13-12-24-11-10-21/h2-9,16,22H,10-15H2,1H3/b3-2+/i21-1; Key:YNDIAUKFXKEXSV-CRYLGTRXSA-N

Florbetapir (^{18}F), sold under the brand name Amyvid, is a PET scanning radiopharmaceutical compound containing the radionuclide fluorine-18 that was approved for use in the United States in 2012, as a diagnostic tool for Alzheimer's disease. Florbetapir, like Pittsburgh compound B (PiB), binds to beta-amyloid, however fluorine-18 has a half-life of 109.75 minutes, in contrast to PiB's radioactive half life of 20 minutes. The longer life allows the tracer to accumulate significantly more in the brains of people with AD, particularly in the regions known to be associated with beta-amyloid deposits.

== Development ==
Since the disease was first described by Alois Alzheimer in 1906, the only certain way to determine if a person indeed had the disease was to perform a biopsy on the patient's brain to find distinctive spots on the brain that show the buildup of amyloid plaque. Doctors must diagnose the disease in patients with memory loss and dementia based on symptoms, and as many as 20% of patients diagnosed with the disease are found after examination of the brain following death not to have had the condition. Other diagnostic tools, such as analysis of cerebrospinal fluid, magnetic resonance imaging scans looking for brain shrinkage and PET scans looking at how glucose was used in the brain, had all been unreliable.

The development of florbetapir built on research done by William Klunk and Chester Mathis who had developed a substance they called Pittsburgh compound B as a means of detecting amyloid plaque, after analyzing 400 prospective compounds and developing 300 variations of the substance that they had discovered might work. In 2002, a study performed in Sweden on Alzheimer's patients was able to detect the plaque in PET brain scans. Later studies on a control group member without the disease did not find plaque, confirming the reliability of the compound in diagnosis. While the tool worked, Pittsburgh compound B relies on the use of carbon-11, a radioactive isotope with a half-life of 20 minutes that requires the immediate use of the material prepared in a cyclotron.

Avid Radiopharmaceuticals was established in July 2005, with the goal of finding a isotope that could be injected into the body, would cross the blood–brain barrier, and attach itself to amyloid protein deposits in the brain. Avid raised $500,000 from BioAdvance, a medically oriented venture capital firm in Pennsylvania, as seed funding toward the development of a biological marker. Once they found a candidate isotope, they attached the positron-emitting fluorine-18, a radioactive isotope with a half-life over five times longer (109.75 minutes), used in PET scans, and that can last for as long as a day when prepared in the morning by cyclotron. The isotope had been developed and patented by the University of Pennsylvania and was licensed by Avid.

Initial tests in 2007 on a patient at Johns Hopkins Hospital in Baltimore previously diagnosed with symptoms of Alzheimer's disease detected plaque in a PET scan in areas where it was typically found in the brain. Further tests found that the scans detected plaque in patients with Alzheimer's, didn't find it in those without the diagnosis and found intermediate amounts in patients with early signs of dementia. The tests found amyloid plaque in 20% of its test patients over age 60 that had been in the normal range, but had performed worse than a control group on tests of mental acuity.

=== Validation by autopsy ===
In order to confirm if the isotope was accurate in detecting Alzheimer's, an advisory committee at the Food and Drug Administration demanded that the team of Avid, Bayer and General Electric perform a study to test their method. Avid established a study with a group of 35 hospice patients, some that had been diagnosed with dementia and others that had no memory problems. The participants and their families agreed that they would undergo the PET scans and would have their brains autopsied after their death by pathologists. After the study was conducted, Avid received confirmation in May 2010 that the results of the test were successful in distinguishing between those with Alzheimer's and those without the disease.

In results presented in July 2010, the company showed that for 34 out of the 35 hospice patients who had been scanned, the initial scan results were confirmed when pathologists counted plaque under a microscope and when a computerized scan of the plaque was performed on material from the autopsied brain. The findings required review by the FDA to confirm their reliability as a means of diagnosing the disease. Once confirmed, the technique provided a means to reliably diagnose and monitor the progress of Alzheimer's and allowed potential pharmaceutical treatments to be evaluated.

In January 2011, Avid reported on the results of further studies conducted based on 152 test subjects who had agreed to receive the company's PET scans and to have their brains analyzed after death for definitive determination of the presence of amyloid plaques. Of the patients included in the study, 29 who died had autopsies performed on their brains and in all but one the brain autopsy results matched the diagnosis based on the PET scan taken before death. Avid's technique is being used to test the efficacy of Alzheimer's disease treatments being developed by other pharmaceutical firms as a means of determining the ability of the drugs to reduce the buildup of amyloid protein in the brains of living subjects.

== Approval by FDA and EMA ==
In January 2011, an FDA advisory committee unanimously recommended that Avid's PET scan technique be approved for use. The advisory committee included a qualification requiring Avid to develop clear guidelines establishing when the tests had spotted enough of the amyloid plaque to make a diagnosis of Alzheimer's.

On October 18, 2012, the Committee for Medicinal Products for Human Use (CHMP) of the European Medicines Agency approved Amyvid for PET imaging of β-amyloid neuritic plaque density.

== Acquisition by Eli Lilly ==
Eli Lilly and Company announced in November 2010, that they would acquire Avid for $800 million.

According to the agreement, "Lilly will acquire all outstanding shares of Avid for an upfront payment of $300 million, subject to adjustment based on existing cash on hand at closing. Avid stockholders will also be eligible for up to $500 million in additional payments contingent upon potential future regulatory and commercial milestones for florbetapir."
