= IEEE Transactions on Nuclear Science =

- Discipline: Nuclear science, nuclear engineering
- Language: English
- Edited by: Zane Bell

Publication details
- Former names: Transactions of the Institute of Radio Engineers Professional Group on Nuclear Science (1954); IRE Transactions on Nuclear Science (1955-1962)
- History: 1954-present
- Publisher: IEEE
- Frequency: Monthly
- Impact factor: 1.8 (2022)

Standard abbreviations
- ISO 4: IEEE Trans. Nucl. Sci.

Indexing
- CODEN: IETNAE
- ISSN: 0018-9499 (print); 1558-1578 (web)
- LCCN: 499741646
- OCLC no.: 81643614

Links
- Journal homepage; Online access; Online archive

IEEE Transactions on Nuclear Science is a peer-reviewed scientific journal published monthly by the IEEE. Sponsored by IEEE Nuclear and Plasma Sciences Society, the journal covers the theory, technology, and application areas related to nuclear science and engineering. Its editor-in-chief is Zane Bell (Oak Ridge National Laboratory).

The journal was founded in 1954 under the name Transactions of the Institute of Radio Engineers Professional Group on Nuclear Science and was retitled to IRE Transactions on Nuclear Science the following year. Its title was changed to its current name in 1963.

According to the Journal Citation Reports, the journal has a 2022 impact factor of 1.8.
