= Fallypride =

Chemical compound

Fallypride (^{18}F)

Clinical data
- Pregnancy category: N/A
- ATC code: none

Legal status
- Legal status: Research compound

Identifiers
- IUPAC name: 5-(3-^{18}F-fluoropropyl)-2,3-dimethoxy-N-[(2S)-1-prop-2-enylpyrrolidin-2-yl]methyl]benzamide
- CAS Number: 166173-78-0
- PubChem CID: 10021692
- DrugBank: DB15167
- ChemSpider: 8197265
- UNII: G9FWZ369GX
- ChEMBL: ChEMBL392158
- CompTox Dashboard (EPA): DTXSID30937173

Chemical and physical data
- Formula: C_{20}H_{29}FN_{2}O_{3}
- Molar mass: 364.461 g·mol^{−1}
- 3D model (JSmol): Interactive image
- SMILES: COC1=CC(=CC(=C1OC)C(=O)NC[C@@H]2CCCN2CC=C)CCCF
- InChI: InChI=1S/C20H29FN2O3/c1-4-10-23-11-6-8-16(23)14-22-20(24)17-12-15(7-5-9-21)13-18(25-2)19(17)26-3/h4,12-13,16H,1,5-11,14H2,2-3H3,(H,22,24)/t16-/m0/s1; Key:OABRYNHZQBZDMG-INIZCTEOSA-N

Fallypride is a high-affinity dopamine D2/D3 receptor antagonist used in medical research, usually in the form of fallypride (^{18}F) as a positron emission tomography (PET) radiotracer in human studies.
