= Mefway (18F) =

Chemical compound

Mefway (^{18}F)

Clinical data
- Pregnancy category: N/A
- ATC code: none

Legal status
- Legal status: Research compound

Identifiers
- IUPAC name: 4-[(^{18}F)fluoromethyl]-N-{2-[4-(2-methoxyphenyl)piperazin-1-yl]ethyl}-N-(pyridin-2-yl)cyclohexane-1-carboxamide
- CAS Number: 943962-60-5
- PubChem CID: 11963740
- ChemSpider: 10137857
- UNII: 0NM517978A
- CompTox Dashboard (EPA): DTXSID50241461

Chemical and physical data
- Formula: C_{26}H_{35}FN_{4}O_{2}
- Molar mass: 454.590 g·mol^{−1}
- 3D model (JSmol): Interactive image
- SMILES: COC1=CC=CC=C1N2CCN(CC2)CCN(C3=CC=CC=N3)C(=O)C4CCC(CC4)C[18F]
- InChI: InChI=1S/C26H35FN4O2/c1-33-24-7-3-2-6-23(24)30-17-14-29(15-18-30)16-19-31(25-8-4-5-13-28-25)26(32)22-11-9-21(20-27)10-12-22/h2-8,13,21-22H,9-12,14-20H2,1H3/i27-1; Key:BQGLPDFQLBNUGU-FMLNDMEQSA-N

Mefway is a serotonin 5-HT_{1A} receptor antagonist used in medical research, usually in the form of mefway (^{18}F) as a positron emission tomography (PET) radiotracer.

== Chemistry ==
Mefway is closely related to the research compound WAY-100,635. The compound adds a fluoromethyl group to the cyclohexyl ring of WAY-100,635 and it is effectively prepared with automation module. There are two isomers with regard to the cyclohexane ring, of which the trans conformation has the higher 5-HT_{1A} specificity.

== Animal PET studies ==
In one study the uptake and retention of mefway (^{18}F) was found to be similar to that found for ^{11}C-WAY-100,635. Head-to-head comparison of mefway (^{18}F) and ^{11}C-WAY-100,635 have been evaluated. Since ^{11}C-WAY-100,635 is the current 'gold standard' and difficult to synthesize, a suitable fluorine-18 replacement as in mefway is highly desired. In addition, mefway (^{18}F) showed comparable brain uptake and the target-to-reference ratios compared to fcway(^{18}F)

The ability to separately measure dissociation constant, K_{D} and receptor density Bmax has been shown to be of potential value rather than simply comparing binding potential, BP_{ND}. Multiple injection mefway PET experiments can be used for the in-vivo measurement of 5-HT_{1A} receptor density.

Imaging studies of mefway on in vivo and ex vivo rat brains indicate that the substance binds to the known 5-HT_{1A} receptor regions including the dorsal raphe. These findings support that the dorsal raphe is measurable in rat PET studies. Mefway (^{18}F) undergoes in vivo defluorination in rodent brain and this phenomenon was effectively suppressed by cytochrome P450 inhibitor (i.e. fluconazole). Animal models of Parkinson's disease and the acute physical stress model exhibited significant decrement of binding potential in the hippocampus

== Human PET studies ==
First-in-human studies have shown in vivo stability of mefway (^{18}F) and its localization to 5-HT_{1A} receptor-rich regions in the human brain, including the raphe nucleus. Mefway (^{18}F) is highly selective for the human serotonin 5-HT_{1A} receptor and may therefore may be used to quantify serotonin 5-HT_{1A} receptor distribution in brain regions for the study of various central nervous system disorders.
