= Fluorodopa (18F) =

Chemical compound

Fluorodopa (^{18}F)

Clinical data
- Trade names: Fluorodopa F18
- Other names: 6-fluoro-L-DOPA, FDOPA
- AHFS/Drugs.com: Micromedex Detailed Consumer Information
- License data: US DailyMed: Fluorodopa
- Routes of administration: Intravenous
- ATC code: V09IX05 (WHO)

Legal status
- Legal status: US: ℞-only

Identifiers
- IUPAC name: (2S)-2-amino-3-(2-(18F)fluoranyl-4,5-dihydroxyphenyl)propanoic acid
- CAS Number: 92812-82-3
- PubChem CID: 56494
- DrugBank: DB13848
- ChemSpider: 50970
- UNII: 2C598205QX
- KEGG: D04220
- ChEBI: CHEBI:49166
- ChEMBL: ChEMBL3400972
- CompTox Dashboard (EPA): DTXSID60239157

Chemical and physical data
- Formula: C_{9}H_{10}FNO_{4}
- Molar mass: 215.180 g·mol^{−1}
- 3D model (JSmol): Interactive image
- SMILES: C1=C(C(=CC(=C1O)O)F)CC(C(=O)O)N
- InChI: InChI=1S/C9H10FNO4/c10-5-3-8(13)7(12)2-4(5)1-6(11)9(14)15/h2-3,6,12-13H,1,11H2,(H,14,15)/t6-/m0/s1/i10-1; Key:PAXWQORCRCBOCU-RPDRGXCHSA-N

Fluorodopa (^{18}F), also known as FDOPA, is a fluorinated form of L-DOPA primarily synthesized as its fluorine-18 isotopologue for use as a radiotracer in positron emission tomography (PET).

The most common side effects are injection site pain.

== Medical uses ==
Fluorodopa (^{18}F) is indicated for use in positron emission tomography (PET) to visualize dopaminergic nerve terminals in the striatum for the evaluation of adults with suspected Parkinsonian syndromes.

== History ==
In October 2019, Fluorodopa (^{18}F) was approved in the United States for the visual detection of certain nerve cells in adults with suspected Parkinsonian syndromes.

The US Food and Drug Administration approved Fluorodopa F 18 based on evidence from one clinical trial of 56 participants with suspected Parkinsonian syndromes. The trial was conducted at one clinical site in the United States.
