= Flutemetamol (18F) =

Chemical compound

Flutemetamol (^{18}F)

Clinical data
- Trade names: Vizamyl
- AHFS/Drugs.com: Micromedex Detailed Consumer Information
- License data: US DailyMed: Flutemetamol
- Routes of administration: Intravenous
- ATC code: V09AX04 (WHO)

Legal status
- Legal status: US: ℞-only; EU: Rx-only; In general: ℞ (Prescription only)

Identifiers
- IUPAC name: 2-[3-(^{18}F)Fluoro-4-(methylamino)phenyl]-1,3-benzothiazol-6-ol
- CAS Number: 765922-62-1
- PubChem CID: 15950376
- ChemSpider: 13092196
- UNII: L49M066S0O
- KEGG: D10231
- ChEBI: CHEBI:76611
- CompTox Dashboard (EPA): DTXSID80227394

Chemical and physical data
- Formula: C_{14}H_{11}^{18}FN_{2}OS
- Molar mass: 273.316 g·mol^{−1}
- 3D model (JSmol): Interactive image
- SMILES: CNC1=C(C=C(C=C1)C2=NC3=C(S2)C=C(C=C3)O)[18F]
- InChI: InChI=1S/C14H11FN2OS/c1-16-11-4-2-8(6-10(11)15)14-17-12-5-3-9(18)7-13(12)19-14/h2-7,16,18H,1H3/i15-1; Key:VVECGOCJFKTUAX-HUYCHCPVSA-N

Flutemetamol (^{18}F) (trade name Vizamyl, by GE Healthcare) is a PET scanning radiopharmaceutical containing the radionuclide fluorine-18, used as a diagnostic tool for Alzheimer's disease.

== Adverse effects ==
Adverse effects of flutemetamol include headache, nausea, dizziness, flushing and increased blood pressure.

== Mechanism of action ==
After the substance is given intravenously, it accumulates in beta amyloid plaques in the patient's brain, which thus become visible via positron emission tomography (PET).

== Manufacturing and distribution ==
Flutemetamol (^{18}F) can be produced within five to six hours. It then undergoes a quality check and is ready to be distributed immediately after. The product must be used within a certain time frame for maximum efficacy. Because of the limited time window, flutemetamol is not produced until an order has been placed.

Flutemetamol is typically administered intravenously in 1 to 10 mL doses. Average costs for PET scans without insurance coverage are around $3,000. Currently Medicare does not cover use of amyloid imaging agents except for in clinical trials. Because of this, there is a low market for flutemetamol.

== History ==
Flutemetamol was first approved for use in the US by the Food and Drug Administration (FDA) in 2013 for intravenous use.

=== Clinical trials ===
Two clinical trials were conducted for flutemetamol (^{18}F). They first compared PET scans of terminally ill patients with flutemetamol to post mortem standard-of-truth assessments of cerebral cortical neuritic plaque density. The second trial assessed intra-reader reproducibility of PET scans using flutemetamol.

==== Clinical trial 1 ====
Of the 176 patients imaged in this trial had a median age was 82, with 57 of patients being female. The initial flutemetamol PET scan resulted in 43 positive and 25 negative results for cerebral cortisol amyloid status. 69 of the initial patients died within 13 months of the flutemetamol PET scan. The autopsy for 67 of those patients determined the global brain neuritic plaque density category. Of those 67 patients 41 were positive and 26 were negative. These results correlate with the pre-mortem scan.

==== Clinical trial 2 ====
The second clinical trial included 276 subjects with a median age of 72. The trial measured the effectiveness of an electronic training program for flutemetamol image interpretation using PET scans from trial 1 among other subjects with a variety of cognitive impairment. Final results met the pre-specified success rate with a Fleiss' kappa statistic of 0.83.
