= Michael E. Phelps =

American biophysicist

Michael Edward Phelps (born August 24, 1939) is a professor and an American biophysicist. He is known for being one of the fathers of positron emission tomography (PET).

== Biography ==
Phelps was born in 1939 in Cleveland, Ohio. He spent his early life as a boxer. However, at age 19, he was severely injured in a car crash, leaving him in a coma for several days and effectively ending his boxing career. Phelps went on to earn his B.S. in chemistry and mathematics from Western Washington University in 1965, and his Ph.D. in chemistry from Washington University in St. Louis, in 1970. He joined the faculty of Washington University School of Medicine in 1970. From 1975 to 1976, Phelps was a member of the faculty at the University of Pennsylvania. In 1976, he moved to the David Geffen School of Medicine at UCLA where he is the Norton Simon Professor, chairman of the department of molecular & medical pharmacology, and director of two institutes: the Institute for Molecular Medicine and the Crump Institute for Molecular Imaging. He has been awarded some of science's highest honors: the Massry Prize from the Keck School of Medicine, University of Southern California in 2007; an Enrico Fermi Award and an appointment to the National Academy of Sciences.

Following its inception in 1973, PET has been used in a wide variety of medical applications. For example, PET images of glucose metabolism provide pictures of the metabolic function of the living, developing or aging brain and heart muscle, as well as the altered metabolic states that occur in diseases such as Alzheimer's disease and cancer. PET technology has been applied to the early diagnosis and therapeutic responses in lung, colorectal, breast, ovarian, lymphoma, melanoma, and prostate cancers. PET imaging probes of neurotransmitters are used to observe the normal communication between neuronal systems in the brain as well as the alteration of neuronal functions in disease such as Parkinson's and drug abuse. Recently, Phelps and his co-workers developed an approach to imaging gene expression that promises to be an important contribution to the rapidly expanding field of molecular medicine.
Phelps' initial work dealt with the application of basic nuclear physics, chemistry, and mathematics to biomedical imaging. He combined a number of original insights in developing PET: First, he recognized that positron decay provides the opportunity for a unique coincidence detection system, with opposing detectors. This detection system allows spatial resolution previously not obtainable. Second, using the principle of coincidence detection, he configured a circumferential array of detectors and associated electronics and a mathematical algorithm for forming three-dimensional tomographic images of biological probes of the living human body. Finally, he recognized that the positron-emitting forms of oxygen, nitrogen, carbon and fluorine provide the tools to "label" biochemical molecules for their use as probes, to non-invasive image biological processes in living individuals. By 1973, Phelps was able to convert these insights into the first PET scanner.

Phelps subsequently developed an array of biological assay techniques for PET-based measurements of hemodynamic, biochemical, and biological processes in the brain, heart, and tumors. The success of these measurements drove further refinements both in the development of PET scanners and in the development of biological assay methods. Phelps also conceptualized the miniaturization, automation, and integration of cyclotron technology and biochemical synthesizers necessary for the synthesis of positron-labeled probes into a single, PC-controlled device for producing positron-labeled compounds for research and clinical care.

Phelps established and directed the first clinical PET service exclusively for patient care. This clinic was the first to be used for PET-based diagnoses in such areas as Alzheimer's disease, multi-infarct dementia, Huntington's disease, depression, Parkinson's disease, adult and childhood epilepsies, cardiovascular disease, and numerous types of cancers. Phelps established a large training program to produce scientists and physicians with expertise in PET scanning. His trainees now populate PET research and clinical centers throughout the world.

== Personal life ==
Michael Phelps currently resides in Los Angeles with wife, Dr. Patricia Phelps, who is a professor of physiological sciences at UCLA. They have two children.
