= Desmethoxyfallypride =

Chemical compound

Desmethoxyfallypride (^{18}F)

Clinical data
- Other names: DMFP (18F)
- ATC code: none

Identifiers
- IUPAC name: 5-(3-fluoropropyl)-2-methoxy-N-[[(2S)-1-prop-2-enylpyrrolidin-2-yl]methyl]benzamide
- CAS Number: 166173-81-5
- PubChem CID: 10404663
- ChemSpider: 8580101
- UNII: CJD4EF9EME
- ChEMBL: ChEMBL428561

Chemical and physical data
- Formula: C_{19}H_{27}FN_{2}O_{2}
- Molar mass: 334.435 g·mol^{−1}
- 3D model (JSmol): Interactive image
- SMILES: COC1=C(C=C(C=C1)CCCF)C(=O)NC[C@@H]2CCCN2CC=C
- InChI: InChI=1S/C19H27FN2O2/c1-3-11-22-12-5-7-16(22)14-21-19(23)17-13-15(6-4-10-20)8-9-18(17)24-2/h3,8-9,13,16H,1,4-7,10-12,14H2,2H3,(H,21,23)/t16-/m0/s1; Key:VPBJNBUDASILSQ-INIZCTEOSA-N

Desmethoxyfallypride is a moderate affinity dopamine D_{2} receptor/D_{3} receptor antagonist used in medical research, usually in the form of the radiopharmaceutical [F-18]-desmethoxyfallypride (DMFP(^{18}F)) which has been used in human studies as a positron emission tomography (PET) radiotracer.
