= Florbetaben (18F) =

Diagnostic radiotracer

Florbetaben (^{18}F)

Clinical data
- Trade names: Neuraceq
- Other names: BAY-949172
- AHFS/Drugs.com: FDA Professional Drug Information
- License data: US DailyMed: Florbetaben
- Routes of administration: Intravenous
- ATC code: V09AX06 (WHO)

Legal status
- Legal status: CA: ℞-only; US: ℞-only; EU: Rx-only

Identifiers
- IUPAC name: 4-{(E)-2-[4-(2-{2-[2-(^{18}F)Fluoroethoxy]ethoxy}ethoxy)phenyl]vinyl}-N-methylaniline
- CAS Number: 902143-01-5
- PubChem CID: 11501341
- ChemSpider: 9676143
- UNII: TLA7312TOI
- KEGG: D10002
- ChEBI: CHEBI:79033
- CompTox Dashboard (EPA): DTXSID20238065

Chemical and physical data
- Formula: C_{21}H_{26}^{18}FNO_{3}
- Molar mass: 358.44 g·mol^{−1}
- 3D model (JSmol): Interactive image
- SMILES: CNC1=CC=C(C=C1)/C=C/C2=CC=C(C=C2)OCCOCCOCC[18F]
- InChI: InChI=1S/C21H26FNO3/c1-23-20-8-4-18(5-9-20)2-3-19-6-10-21(11-7-19)26-17-16-25-15-14-24-13-12-22/h2-11,23H,12-17H2,1H3/b3-2+/i22-1; Key:NCWZOASIUQVOFA-FWZJPQCDSA-N

Florbetaben, sold under the brand name Neuraceq, is a diagnostic radiotracer developed for routine clinical application to visualize β-amyloid plaques in the brain. It is a fluorine-18 (^{18}F)-labeled 4-methylamino-trans-stilbene derivative.

Florbetaben was approved for medical use in the European Union, the United States, and South Korea in 2014 and in Canada in 2017.

== Medical uses ==
Florbetaben is indicated for Positron Emission Tomography (PET) imaging of β-amyloid neuritic plaque density in the brains of adults with cognitive impairment who are being evaluated for Alzheimer's disease (AD) and other causes of cognitive impairment.

== Alzheimer's disease and amyloid-beta PET imaging ==
The deposition of β-amyloid is considered as one hallmark in the pathogenesis of AD, and most likely begins years before the onset of detectable cognitive symptoms. Clinical testing using neuropsychology or memory examinations is the standard tool to diagnose AD as clinically possible or probable. Confirmation of the clinical diagnosis requires the identification of β-amyloid plaques in the brain. Until recently, this was only possible after death, in postmortem histopathology. The need of diagnosis confirmation during life has led to the development and incorporation of biomarkers, such as cerebrospinal fluid and amyloid imaging markers, as supplementary tools to facilitate clinical testing in the workflow of AD diagnosis.

When used in conjunction with other clinical tests, florbetaben can assist in the diagnosis of AD by detecting the presence or absence of β-amyloid plaques. This is particularly relevant at the prodromal AD stage of mild cognitive impairment (MCI) and at the dementia stage of this disease, where clinical tests lack accuracy to establish a trustworthy AD diagnosis.

== Development program ==
Florbetaben binding to β-amyloid plaques on human brain samples was originally demonstrated in 2005. Highly selective binding for β-amyloid over other proteins (e.g., tau and a-synuclein) has been demonstrated in vitro. Initial single-center studies demonstrated the potential for florbetaben PET imaging to discriminate between AD patients and non-AD patients or healthy volunteers. Single dose pharmacokinetics of 300 MBq florbetaben of low or high mass dose (<=5 and 50–55 μg) showed no relevant differences between Japanese and Caucasian populations. When compared to healthy subjects, cortical uptake of florbetaben was demonstrated to be generally higher in a large proportion of patients with a clinical diagnosis of AD or mild cognitive impairment. Longitudinal data of 45 patients with MCI indicated that florbetaben PET imaging may be useful to identify patients who will progress to AD. A substantial proportion of patients with a positive florbetaben PET scan progressed to AD-dementia over a 2-year and 4-year time frame. At 4-year follow-up, 88% (21/24) of individuals with MCI and positive florbetaben uptake converted to clinical dementia due to AD, whereas none of 21 florbetaben-negative individuals with MCI experienced a conversion. The pivotal phase III study investigated the relationship of florbetaben imaging and amyloid deposition in the brain in patients with a clinical diagnosis of AD and other dementias and subjects without dementia.

Florbetaben PET imaging showed strong tracer accumulation in the anatomically matched brain regions confirmed to have β-amyloid plaques by postmortem histopathology, thus providing direct target validation for florbetaben. Evaluation of whole brain florbetaben PET images using the clinically applicable visual assessment method demonstrated that florbetaben provides good diagnostic efficacy in detecting/excluding cerebral neuritic β-amyloid plaques. Sensitivity and specificity of the whole brain assessment was 98 and 89%, respectively, against the histopathological standard of truth. Good agreement between blinded readers (kappa 0.90) was reported. Furthermore, high negative and positive predictive values were reported for florbetaben imaging to exclude or detect β-amyloid plaques (negative predictive value 96.0% and positive predictive value 93.9%, see). Intravenous injections of florbetaben are generally well tolerated in all subject groups. Analysis of 872 patients with 978 florbetaben administrations found no serious adverse reactions related to the tracer. All adverse reactions reported were mild to moderate in severity and temporary only. The most common reactions (incidence < 1%) were injection-site pain (3.9% of patients), injection-site erythema (1.7%) and injection-site irritation (1.2%). There was no overall difference in the tolerability of florbetaben between different age populations. Repeated annual florbetaben injections showed no differences in the tolerability profile. Risks and side effects are addressed in the patient information leaflet. You may also ask your doctor or pharmacist for further information.
