= Mallinckrodt Institute of Radiology =

Academic center in St. Louis, Missouri, US

- Type: Private
- Location: St. Louis, Missouri, U.S.
- Campus: Urban
- Website: mir.wustl.edu

The Mallinckrodt Institute of Radiology (MIR), established 1931, is an academic radiology center associated with the Washington University School of Medicine, located within the Washington University Medical Center in St. Louis, Missouri. In addition to providing diagnostic and therapeutic patient-care services, the institute is a top research and education center. It employs over 140 academic staff and is among the top recipients of National Institutes of Health funding of radiology departments. The center provides radiology services to Barnes-Jewish and St. Louis Children's hospitals, as well as multiple other hospitals and outpatient centers in the St. Louis area. The center performs 700,000 examinations and procedures annually.

Mallinckrodt has for decades been considered the premier radiology residency training program in the United States and has consistently been ranked among the top three radiology training programs in the country. In 2020, Doximity ranked the institute at #2, and U.S. News & World Report ranked the institute at #5 in radiology in the United States.

== History ==
At the beginning of the 20th century, the discipline of radiology was still in its infancy. Early medical imaging consisted primarily of x-ray studies used for diagnostic evaluation, and the clinical application for such tests was still being explored. Although Washington University School of Medicine began providing radiology services in 1910, there was no academic division of radiology at that time.

In the 1920s, prominent Washington University thoracic surgeon, Evart Graham, became interested in developing an imaging test to assess the gallbladder and biliary system. It was already known that chemical agents such as phenolphthalein, once ingested, were concentrated by the liver and secreted into bile in dogs. Graham enlisted the help of Edward Mallinckrodt, Sr., owner of local pharmaceutical company Mallinckrodt Chemical Works, to contribute chemists to the work of developing a chemical which could be used to help visualize the gallbladder by imaging. Once the chemical compound and techniques were refined for use clinical use in humans, the techniques were published in 1924 and cholecystography quickly became a widely accepted clinical procedure.

Success with this early imaging development prompted the creation of a radiology department in 1925. In 1928, philanthropist Edward Mallinckrodt, Jr. (son of Edward Mallinckrodt, Sr., and Washington University board of trustees member) endowed Mallinckrodt Institute of Radiology in his father's name. The MIR cornerstone was laid in 1930, and MIR was in operation by 1931 with a staff of four radiologists and a physicist. Resident training began in 1933.

In 1964, Mallinckrodt became the site for the first cyclotron specifically developed for medical studies. Radioactive materials from this cyclotron were later used to develop positron emission tomography.

== Notable faculty/alumni ==
- Wendell Scott - 1935, chiefly responsible for development of roentgen kymography film
- Jean Kieffer - 1938, developed laminography, an early precursor to tomographic imaging
- Martin Kamen - co-discoverer of carbon-14, involved in research in intermediary metabolism and application towards radiotherapy with cobalt-60
- Jerold Wallis - 1988, developed use of rotating maximum intensity projection for use in nuclear medicine imaging
- Marcus Raichle - pioneer of functional brain imaging and discoverer of the brain's default mode network
