= Fluorine-18 =

Isotope of fluorine emitting a positron

- Decay over 24 hours

General
- Symbol: ^{18}F
- Names: fluorine-18, Fluorine-18
- Protons (Z): 9
- Neutrons (N): 9

Nuclide data
- Natural abundance: Radioisotope
- Half-life (t_{1/2}): 109.734 min
- Isotope mass: 18.0009380 Da
- Spin: 1^{+}
- Excess energy: 873.431±0.593 keV
- Nuclear binding energy: 137369.199±0.593 keV
- Decay products: ^{18}O

Decay modes
- Decay mode: Decay energy (MeV)
- Positron emission (97%): 0.6335
- Electron capture (3%): 1.6555

Fluorine-18 (^{18}F, also called radiofluorine) is a fluorine radioisotope which is an important source of positrons. Its half-life is 109.734 minutes, less than two hours, and one of the shortest of radioisotopes with use outside research. It decays by positron emission 96.7% of the time and electron capture 3.3% of the time. Both modes of decay yield stable oxygen-18.

== Natural occurrence ==
^{18}F is a cosmogenic trace radioisotope produced by spallation of atmospheric argon or by reaction of protons with oxygen-18 in the air: ^{18}O + p → ^{18}F + n.

== Synthesis ==
In the radiopharmaceutical industry, fluorine-18 is made using either a cyclotron or linear particle accelerator to bombard a target, usually of natural or enriched [^{18}O]water with high energy protons (typically ~18 MeV). The fluorine produced is in the form of a water solution of [^{18}F]fluoride, which is then used in a rapid chemical synthesis of various radiopharmaceuticals. This must be done after the fluorine is produced, as chemical bonds would be destroyed by the production (radiolysis).

== History ==
First published synthesis and report of properties of fluorine-18 were in 1937 by Arthur H. Snell, produced by the nuclear reaction of ^{20}Ne(d,α)^{18}F in the cyclotron laboratories of Ernest O. Lawrence.

== Chemistry ==
Fluorine-18 is often substituted for a hydroxyl group (–OH) in a radiotracer parent molecule, due to similar steric and electrostatic properties. This may however be problematic in certain applications due to possible changes in the molecule polarity.

== Applications ==
Fluorine-18 is one of the early tracers used in positron emission tomography (PET), having been in use since the 1960s. Its significance is due to both its short half-life and the emission of positrons when decaying. A major medical use of fluorine-18 is: in positron emission tomography (PET) to image the brain and heart; to image the thyroid gland; as a radiotracer to image bones and seeking cancers that have metastasized from other locations in the body and in radiation therapy treating internal tumors.

Tracers include sodium fluoride which can be useful for skeletal imaging as it displays high and rapid bone uptake accompanied by very rapid blood clearance, which results in a high bone-to-background ratio in a short time and fluorodeoxyglucose (FDG), where the ^{18}F substitutes a hydroxyl. New dioxaborolane chemistry enables radioactive fluoride (^{18}F) labeling of antibodies, which allows for positron emission tomography (PET) imaging of cancer. A Human-Derived, Genetic, Positron-emitting and Fluorescent (HD-GPF) reporter system uses a human protein, PSMA and non-immunogenic, and a small molecule that is positron-emitting (^{18}F) and fluorescent for dual modality PET and fluorescence imaging of genome modified cells, e.g. cancer, CRISPR/Cas9, or CAR T-cells, in an entire mouse. The dual-modality small molecule targeting PSMA was tested in humans and found the location of primary and metastatic prostate cancer, fluorescence-guided removal of cancer, and detects single cancer cells in tissue margins.

Lighter: fluorine-17	Fluorine-18 is an isotope of fluorine	Heavier: fluorine-19
Decay product of: neon-18	Decay chain of fluorine-18	Decays to: oxygen-18
