= Flotufolastat (18F) =

Medication

Flotufolastat (^{18}F)
- Flotufolastat F-18 gallium

Clinical data
- Trade names: Posluma
- Other names: 18F-rhPSMA-7.3, flotufolastat F18 (USAN US)
- License data: US DailyMed: Flotufolastat f-18
- Routes of administration: Intravenous
- ATC code: V09IX18 (WHO)

Legal status
- Legal status: US: ℞-only

Identifiers
- CAS Number: 2639294-14-5
- PubChem CID: 166177191
- DrugBank: DB17851
- ChemSpider: 129955303
- UNII: 811W19E3OL
- KEGG: D12606
- ChEBI: CHEBI:229675

Chemical and physical data
- Formula: C_{63}H_{99}^{18}FN_{12}O_{25}Si
- Molar mass: 1537.3 g·mol^{−1}
- 3D model (JSmol): Interactive image; Interactive image
- SMILES: CC(C)(C)[Si]([18F])(C1=CC=C(C=C1)C(=O)NC[C@@H](NC(=O)CC[C@H](N1CCN(CC(O)=O)CCN(CC(O)=O)CCN(CC(O)=O)CC1)C(O)=O)C(=O)N[C@H](CCCCNC(=O)CCC(=O)NCCC[C@@H](NC(=O)CC[C@H](NC(=O)N[C@@H](CCC(O)=O)C(O)=O)C(O)=O)C(O)=O)C(O)=O)C(C)(C)C; CC(C)(C)[Si](C1=CC=C(C=C1)C(=O)NC[C@H](C(=O)N[C@H](CCCCNC(=O)CCC(=O)NCCC[C@H](C(=O)O)NC(=O)CC[C@@H](C(=O)O)NC(=O)N[C@@H](CCC(=O)O)C(=O)O)C(=O)O)NC(=O)CC[C@@H](C(=O)O)N2CCN(CCN(CCN(CC2)CC(=O)[O-])CC(=O)[O-])CC(=O)[O-])(C(C)(C)C)[18F].[Ga+3]
- InChI: InChI=1S/C63H99FN12O25Si/c1-62(2,3)102(64,63(4,5)6)39-14-12-38(13-15-39)54(89)67-34-44(69-49(80)20-18-45(60(99)100)76-32-30-74(36-52(85)86)28-26-73(35-51(83)84)27-29-75(31-33-76)37-53(87)88)55(90)70-41(57(93)94)10-7-8-24-65-46(77)21-22-47(78)66-25-9-11-40(56(91)92)68-48(79)19-16-42(58(95)96)71-61(101)72-43(59(97)98)17-23-50(81)82/h12-15,40-45H,7-11,16-37H2,1-6H3,(H,65,77)(H,66,78)(H,67,89)(H,68,79)(H,69,80)(H,70,90)(H,81,82)(H,83,84)(H,85,86)(H,87,88)(H,91,92)(H,93,94)(H,95,96)(H,97,98)(H,99,100)(H2,71,72,101)/t40-,41-,42+,43+,44-,45+/m1/s1/i64-1; Key:QMGJNAVROCDAIW-MQNQVPOESA-N; InChI=1S/C63H99FN12O25Si.Ga/c1-62(2,3)102(64,63(4,5)6)39-14-12-38(13-15-39)54(89)67-34-44(69-49(80)20-18-45(60(99)100)76-32-30-74(36-52(85)86)28-26-73(35-51(83)84)27-29-75(31-33-76)37-53(87)88)55(90)70-41(57(93)94)10-7-8-24-65-46(77)21-22-47(78)66-25-9-11-40(56(91)92)68-48(79)19-16-42(58(95)96)71-61(101)72-43(59(97)98)17-23-50(81)82;/h12-15,40-45H,7-11,16-37H2,1-6H3,(H,65,77)(H,66,78)(H,67,89)(H,68,79)(H,69,80)(H,70,90)(H,81,82)(H,83,84)(H,85,86)(H,87,88)(H,91,92)(H,93,94)(H,95,96)(H,97,98)(H,99,100)(H2,71,72,101);/q;+3/p-3/t40-,41-,42+,43+,44-,45+;/m1./s1/i64-1; Key:OJPQWJNFDOFXTN-WRFPGERRSA-K

Flotufolastat (^{18}F), sold under the brand name Posluma, is a radioactive diagnostic agent for use with positron emission tomography (PET) imaging for prostate cancer. The active ingredient is flotufolastat (^{18}F).

Flotufolastat (^{18}F) was approved for medical use in the United States in May 2023.

== Medical uses ==
Flotufolastat (^{18}F) is indicated for positron emission tomography of prostate-specific membrane antigen positive lesions in men with prostate cancer.
