= Floretyrosine (18F) =

Chemical compound

Floretyrosine (^{18}F)

Clinical data
- Trade names: Pixclara
- Other names: Fluoroethyl-L-tyrosine (^{18}F), Floretyrosine F-18, ^{18}F-FET, FET F-18, Floretyrosine F18 (USAN US)
- AHFS/Drugs.com: Pixclara
- License data: US DailyMed: Floretyrosine
- Routes of administration: Intravenous
- Drug class: PET radiotracer
- ATC code: V09IX10 (WHO)

Legal status
- Legal status: US: ℞-only

Identifiers
- IUPAC name: (2S)-2-amino-3-[4-(2-(^{18}F)fluoroethoxy)phenyl]propanoic acid
- CAS Number: 178433-03-9
- PubChem CID: 9834479
- DrugBank: DB15405
- UNII: 1326R5J1IA
- KEGG: D12767

Chemical and physical data
- Formula: C_{11}H_{14}^{18}FNO_{3}
- Molar mass: 226.2 g/mol
- 3D model (JSmol): Interactive image
- SMILES: C([C@@H](C(O)=O)N)C1=CC=C(OCC[18F])C=C1
- InChI: InChI=1S/C11H14FNO3/c12-5-6-16-9-3-1-8(2-4-9)7-10(13)11(14)15/h1-4,10H,5-7,13H2,(H,14,15)/t10-/m0/s1/i12-1; Key:QZZYPHBVOQMBAT-LRAGLOQXSA-N

Floretyrosine (^{18}F), sold under the brand name Pixclara, is a radioactive diagnostic agent used for positron emission tomography (PET) imaging. It is given by intravenous injection.

Floretyrosine (^{18}F) was approved for medical use in the United States in September 2026.

== Medical uses ==
Floretyrosine (^{18}F) is indicated for use with positron emission tomography to differentiate recurrent or progressive glioma from treatment-related change, in conjunction with other diagnostic evaluations, in people aged one month of age and older.

== Society and culture ==
=== Legal status ===
Floretyrosine (^{18}F) was approved for medical use in the United States in September 2026.

=== Brand names ===
Floretyrosine (^{18}F) is sold under the brand name Pixclara.
