= PSMA scan =

Medical imaging technique

A PSMA scan is a nuclear medicine imaging technique used in the diagnosis and staging of prostate cancer. It is carried out by injection of a radiopharmaceutical with a positron or gamma emitting radionuclide and a prostate-specific membrane antigen (PSMA) targeting ligand. After injection, imaging of positron emitters such as gallium-68 (^{68}Ga), copper-64 (^{64}Cu), and fluorine-18 (^{18}F) is carried out with a positron emission tomography (PET) scanner. For gamma emitters such as technetium-99m (^{99m}Tc) and indium-111 (^{111}In) single-photon emission computed tomography (SPECT) imaging is performed with a gamma camera.

As well as the diagnosis and staging of prostate cancer, PSMA imaging can also be used to assess suitability for and plan treatment with external beam radiotherapy and PSMA-targeted radionuclide therapy.

== Mechanism ==
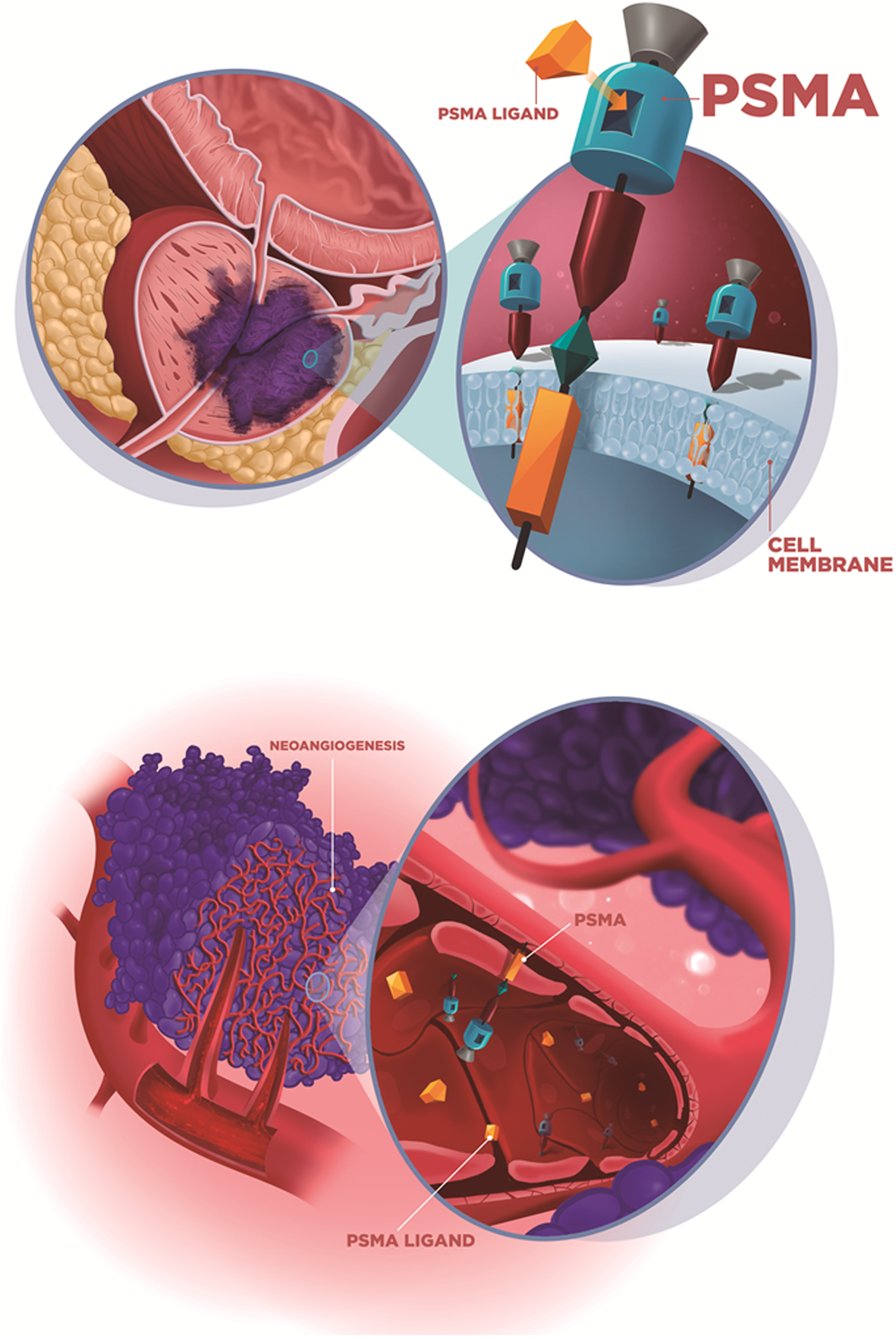
PSMA expression and radiotracer uptake in prostate cancer

Attempts have been made to target the overexpression of PSMA in prostate cancer cells for several decades, although PSMA is also found in other tissue. PSMA targeting molecules have included antibodies, aptamers, peptides, and small-molecule inhibitors. Initially, development focussed on the antibody capromab. Later research has focussed on small molecule ligands that bind to the extracellular active centre of PSMA, such as PSMA-11. These ligands for PSMA-scanning target the large extracellular region of the PSMA glycoprotein.

PSMA however is also over-expressed in non prostate cancer cells, including kidney, salivary gland, lacrimal gland and duodenal mucosa, where physiological uptake may be seen on imaging.

== Clinical use ==
European Association of Urology (EAU) guidelines recognise that PSMA can provide accurate staging, however there is a lack of outcome data to inform further management. The American Society of Clinical Oncology (ASCO) guidelines for imaging of advanced prostate cancer also recommend PSMA imaging (among other PET radiopharmaceuticals), while acknowledging that these are not FDA approved and therefore limited to a clinical trial or other controlled research setting. Although PSMA PET imaging has shown clear superiority over conventional CT and bone scans for detecting prostate cancer, comparative studies assessing different PSMA ligands, such as ^{68}Ga-PSMA-11 and ^{18}F-DCFPyL, remain limited. A 2024 overview of reviews published in Seminars of Nuclear Medicine concluded that while evidence gaps remain for some outcomes and most systematic reviews are at high or unclear risk of bias, the evidence base is broadly supportive of ^{18}F PSMA PET/CT in patients with high-risk prostate cancer or biochemical recurrence

=== Radiopharmaceuticals ===
Radionuclide	Name	INN	Brand name(s)	FDA approval	EMA approval	References
^{18}F	DCFPyL	PIFLUFOLASTAT F-18	Pylarify; Pylclari	Yes	Yes	
^{18}F	PSMA-1007					
^{18}F	rhPSMA-7.3		Posluma	Yes		
^{68}Ga	PSMA-11	Gallium (68Ga) gozetotide	Illucix; Locametz; Illucixwas	Yes	Yes	
^{68}Ga	THP-PSMA	Gallium (68Ga) gozetotide	GalliProst			
^{99m}Tc	PSMA-11					
^{99m}Tc	iPSMA		TLX599-CDx			
^{111}In	capromab pendetide		Prostascint	Yes		
^{111}In	PSMA-I&T					

== Availability ==
In part thanks to the wide range of similar PSMA radiopharmaceuticals, approval by regulatory authorities is at varying stages. Even so, use has been widespread in some areas, particularly as part of clinical trials. For example, European Association of Urology (EAU) guidelines have included recommendations to perform PSMA PET scans in certain circumstances since 2018, and there has been widespread agreement of the utility of PSMA scanning for several years.

=== Oceania ===
==== Australia ====
A kit for manufacture of a ^{68}Ga-PSMA-11 product, branded Illucix, was approved by Australia's Therapeutic Goods Administration (TGA) in 2021.

=== Europe ===
A marketing authorisation application for ^{68}Ga-PSMA-11 (INN Gallium (68Ga) gozetotide), under the brand name Illucix, was made to the Danish Medicines Agency, on behalf of several EU countries and the UK. Approval is expected in 2022.

In 2022 a marketing authorisation application was made by the manufacturer of ^{18}F-DCFPyL (branded Pylclari) to the European Medicines Agency.

Polish manufacturer and distributor of radiopharmaceutical procuts, Polatom, has been granted a US patent for a ^{99m}Tc-PSMA-T4 kit. In the UK, Tc-99m labelled PSMA has product authorisation but lacks funding.

=== North America ===
==== Canada ====
A new drug submission was made to Canada's regulator in 2021, for ^{68}Ga-PSMA-11.

==== United States ====
The first approved PSMA imaging agent was indium-111 (^{111}In) capromab pendetide (branded Prostascint). It received Food and Drug Administration (FDA) approval in 1996. However, the agent had poor sensitivity and saw little widespread use.

The first PET PSMA imaging agent, ^{68}Ga-PSMA-11, was approved by the FDA in 2020. Listed indications include suspected metastasis prior to initial treatment, and recurrence of prostate cancer (based on elevated serum prostate-specific antigen (PSA) level). This was followed by two further ^{68}Ga-PSMA-11 agents in 2021 and 2022 (branded Illucix and Locametz). Listed indications for Lucametz additionally includes selection of patients prior to ^{177}Lu-PSMA radionuclide therapy.

An ^{18}F-PSMA agent (^{18}F-DCFPyL) (branded Pylarify) was approved by the FDA in 2021. Indications are as for ^{68}Ga-PSMA-11.

Another ^{18}F-PSMA agent (^{18}F-rhPSMA-7.3) (branded Posluma) was approved by the FDA in 2023.

=== South America ===
==== Brazil ====
^{68}Ga-PSMA-11 (Illucixwas) was granted initial authorisation in 2021, with full approval expected in 2022.
