= 4-Fluoroestradiol =

Chemical compound

Clinical data
- Other names: 4-FE2; 4-F-17β-E2; 4-Fluoro-17β-estradiol; 4-Fluoroestra-1,3,5-(10)-triene-3,17β-diol; NSC-94528
- Drug class: Estrogen

Identifiers
- IUPAC name: (8R,9S,13S,14S,17S)-4-fluoro-13-methyl-6,7,8,9,11,12,14,15,16,17-decahydrocyclopenta[a]phenanthrene-3,17-diol
- CAS Number: 1881-37-4
- PubChem CID: 10085622
- ChemSpider: 8261159
- ChEMBL: ChEMBL1627337
- CompTox Dashboard (EPA): DTXSID20940297

Chemical and physical data
- Formula: C_{18}H_{23}FO_{2}
- Molar mass: 290.378 g·mol^{−1}
- 3D model (JSmol): Interactive image
- SMILES: C[C@]12CC[C@H]3[C@H]([C@@H]1CC[C@@H]2O)CCC4=C3C=CC(=C4F)O
- InChI: InChI=1S/C18H23FO2/c1-18-9-8-11-10-4-6-15(20)17(19)13(10)3-2-12(11)14(18)5-7-16(18)21/h4,6,11-12,14,16,20-21H,2-3,5,7-9H2,1H3/t11-,12-,14+,16+,18+/m1/s1; Key:QZFXMXJXAUMHQR-ZHIYBZGJSA-N

4-Fluoroestradiol (4-FE2) is a synthetic estrogen and a derivative of estradiol which was never marketed. It is specifically the 4-fluoro analogue of estradiol. 4-Fluoroestradiol has 180 ± 43% of the affinity of estradiol for the estrogen receptor of rat uterine cytosol and shows potent uterotrophic activity similar to that of estradiol in mice and rats. It has been labeled with fluorine-18 (^{18}F) for potential use in medical imaging.

Selected biological properties of endogenous estrogens in rats
Estrogen	ER RBA (%)	Uterine weight (%)	Uterotrophy	LH levels (%)	SHBG RBA (%)
Control	–	100	–	100	–
Estradiol (E2)	100	506 ± 20	+++	12–19	100
Estrone (E1)	11 ± 8	490 ± 22	+++	?	20
Estriol (E3)	10 ± 4	468 ± 30	+++	8–18	3
Estetrol (E4)	0.5 ± 0.2	?	Inactive	?	1
17α-Estradiol	4.2 ± 0.8	?	?	?	?
2-Hydroxyestradiol	24 ± 7	285 ± 8	+^{b}	31–61	28
2-Methoxyestradiol	0.05 ± 0.04	101	Inactive	?	130
4-Hydroxyestradiol	45 ± 12	?	?	?	?
4-Methoxyestradiol	1.3 ± 0.2	260	++	?	9
4-Fluoroestradiol^{a}	180 ± 43	?	+++	?	?
2-Hydroxyestrone	1.9 ± 0.8	130 ± 9	Inactive	110–142	8
2-Methoxyestrone	0.01 ± 0.00	103 ± 7	Inactive	95–100	120
4-Hydroxyestrone	11 ± 4	351	++	21–50	35
4-Methoxyestrone	0.13 ± 0.04	338	++	65–92	12
16α-Hydroxyestrone	2.8 ± 1.0	552 ± 42	+++	7–24	<0.5
2-Hydroxyestriol	0.9 ± 0.3	302	+^{b}	?	?
2-Methoxyestriol	0.01 ± 0.00	?	Inactive	?	4
Notes: Values are mean ± SD or range. ER RBA = Relative binding affinity to estrogen receptors of rat uterine cytosol. Uterine weight = Percentage change in uterine wet weight of ovariectomized rats after 72 hours with continuous administration of 1 μg/hour via subcutaneously implanted osmotic pumps. LH levels = Luteinizing hormone levels relative to baseline of ovariectomized rats after 24 to 72 hours of continuous administration via subcutaneous implant. Footnotes: ^{a} = Synthetic (i.e., not endogenous). ^{b} = Atypical uterotrophic effect which plateaus within 48 hours (estradiol's uterotrophy continues linearly up to 72 hours). Sources:

== See also ==
- 16α-Fluoroestradiol
