= Gallium (68Ga) gozetotide =

Radiopharmaceutical medication

Gallium (^{68}Ga) gozetotide
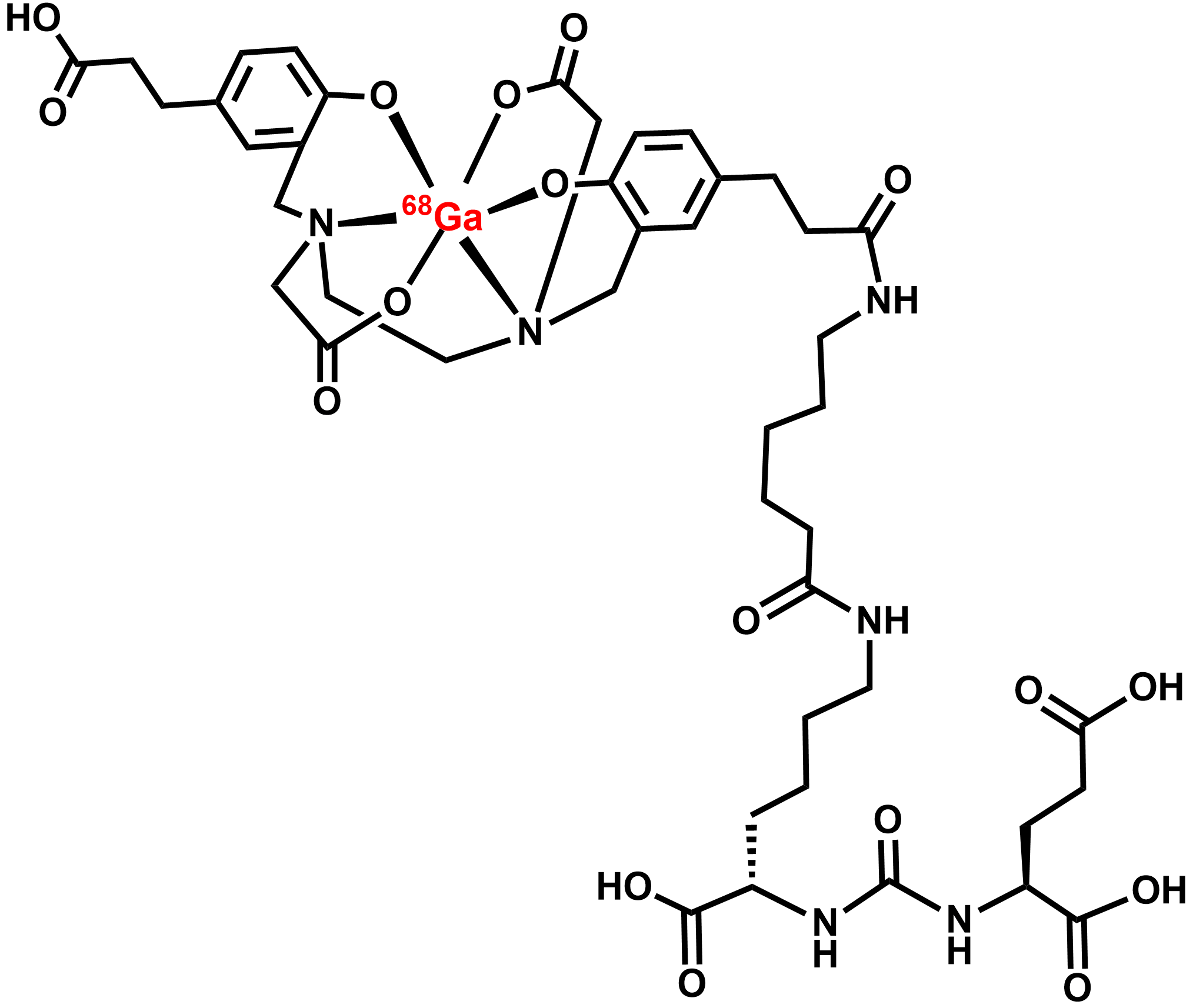

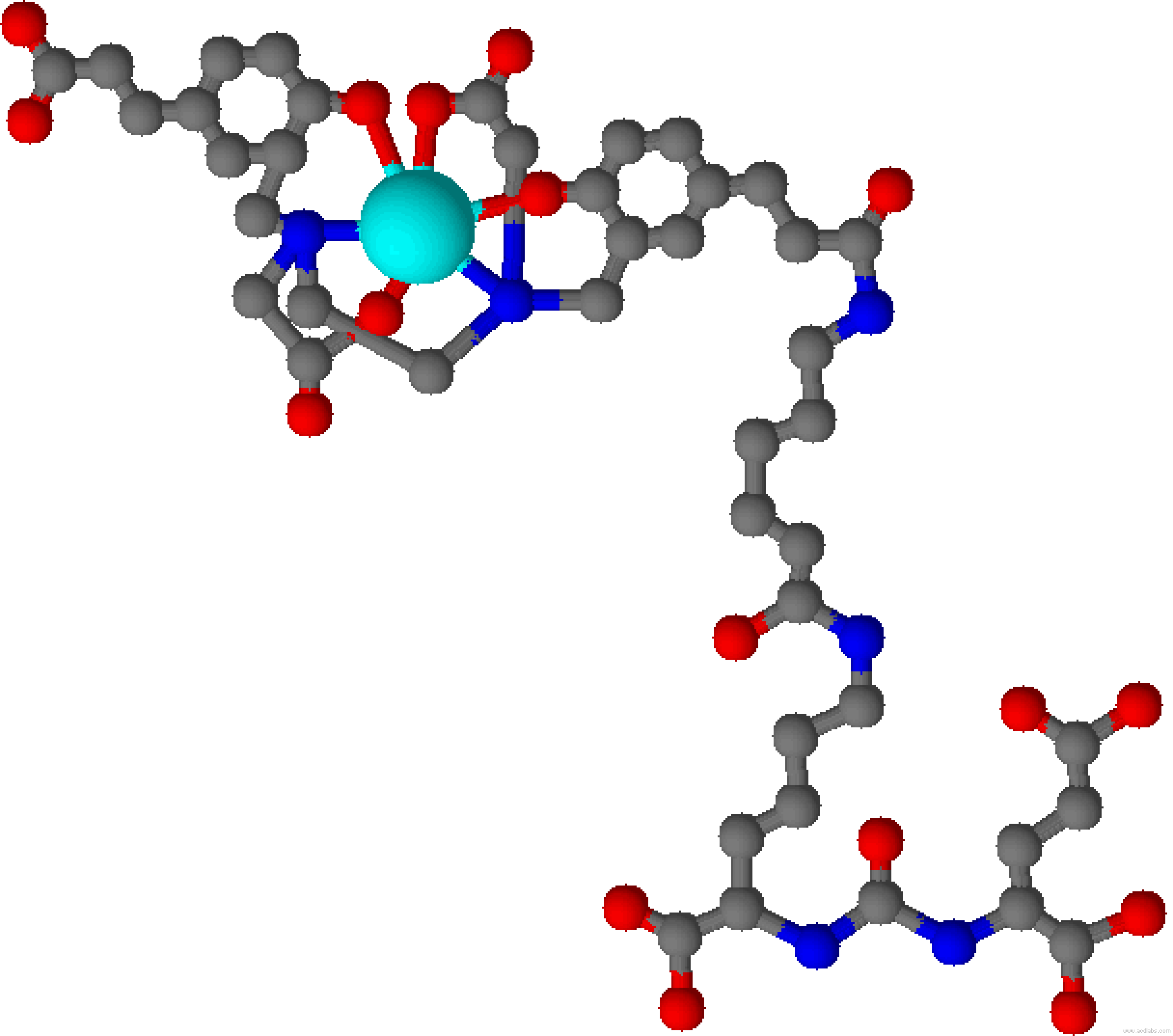

Clinical data
- Trade names: Illuccix, Locametz
- Other names: Gallium 68 PSMA-11, Gallium Ga 68 gozetotide (USAN US)
- AHFS/Drugs.com: Micromedex Detailed Consumer Information
- License data: US DailyMed: Gozetotide
- Pregnancy category: AU: Exempt
- Routes of administration: Intravenous
- ATC code: V09IX14 (WHO)

Legal status
- Legal status: AU: S4 (Prescription only); CA: ℞-only / Schedule C; US: ℞-only; EU: Rx-only

Pharmacokinetic data
- Excretion: Urine

Identifiers
- IUPAC name: 2-[[5-[3-[[6-[[(5S)-5-carboxy-5-[[(1S)-1,3-dicarboxypropyl]carbamoylamino]pentyl]amino]-6-oxohexyl]amino]-3-oxopropyl]-2-oxidophenyl]methyl-[2-[[5-(2-carboxyethyl)-2-oxidophenyl]methyl-(carboxylatomethyl)amino]ethyl]amino]acetate;gallium-68(3+);hydron
- CAS Number: 1906894-20-9
- PubChem CID: 154572876
- DrugBank: DB16019; DB16303
- ChemSpider: 52083842
- UNII: ZJ0EKR6M10
- KEGG: D12257

Chemical and physical data
- 3D model (JSmol): Interactive image
- SMILES: [H+].C1=CC(=C(C=C1CCC(=O)NCCCCCC(=O)NCCCC[C@@H](C(=O)O)NC(=O)N[C@@H](CCC(=O)O)C(=O)O)CN(CCN(CC2=C(C=CC(=C2)CCC(=O)O)[O-])CC(=O)[O-])CC(=O)[O-])[O-].[68Ga+3]
- InChI: InChI=1S/C44H62N6O17.Ga/c51-34-13-8-28(22-30(34)24-49(26-40(59)60)20-21-50(27-41(61)62)25-31-23-29(9-14-35(31)52)11-16-38(55)56)10-15-37(54)46-18-4-1-2-7-36(53)45-19-5-3-6-32(42(63)64)47-44(67)48-33(43(65)66)12-17-39(57)58;/h8-9,13-14,22-23,32-33,51-52H,1-7,10-12,15-21,24-27H2,(H,45,53)(H,46,54)(H,55,56)(H,57,58)(H,59,60)(H,61,62)(H,63,64)(H,65,66)(H2,47,48,67);/q;+3/p-3/t32-,33-;/m0./s1/i;1-2; Key:AEBYHKKMCWUMKX-LNTZDJBBSA-K

Gallium (^{68}Ga) gozetotide or Gallium (^{68}Ga) PSMA-11, is a radiopharmaceutical made of ^{68}Ga conjugated to a inhibitor of the enzyme prostate-specific membrane antigen (PSMA) known as Glu-Urea-Lys(Ahx)-HBED-CC. It is used for imaging prostate cancer by positron emission tomography (PET). The PSMA inhibitor specifically directs the radiolabeled imaging agent towards the prostate cancerous lesions in men.

The most common side effects with gallium (68Ga)-radiolabelled gozetotide are tiredness, nausea (feeling sick), constipation and vomiting.

Gallium (68Ga) gozetotide was approved for medical use in the United States in December 2021, and in the European Union in December 2022. It is the first drug approved by the US Food and Drug Administration (FDA) as a PET imaging agent of prostate-specific membrane antigen (PSMA) positive lesions in men with prostate cancer.

== Structure ==
Radiopharmaceuticals based on HBED are composed of three components: a chelator, a linker and a binding motif.

- The HBED structure acts as the chelator, in which a radiometal is coordinated.
- A linker structure which conjugates the other two molecular components, in this radiopharmaceutical it is a lysine moiety.
- A binding motif or pharmacophore such as a peptide or antibody, which will bind to the target.

One of the most popular HBED chelators is HBED-CC. This chelator can create stable complexes with trivalent gallium at normal temperatures and it attaches to bioactive molecules through its propionic acid moieties.

== Medical uses ==
Gallium (^{68}Ga) gozetotide is a radioactive diagnostic agent indicated for positron emission tomography (PET) of prostate-specific membrane antigen (PSMA)-positive lesions in men with prostate cancer.

Ga 68 PSMA-11 injections are used for PET imaging of prostate-specific membrane antigen (PSMA) positive lesions in males with prostate cancer. It can be given for the patients with suspected metastasis, and the candidates with initial definitive therapy.

== History ==
In the early 2000s, researchers began exploring the use of PSMA as a target for imaging and therapy. The first PSMA-targeted radiotracer was developed using a different radioactive element, technetium-99m. This radiotracer, called 99mTc-MIP-1404, showed promise in preclinical studies but did not perform well in clinical trials.

In 2011, researchers started investigating the use of gallium-68, a different radioactive element, as a more suitable alternative for PSMA-targeted radiotracers. In 2013, the first Ga-PSMA radiotracer was developed by researchers at DKFZ in Germany, and it showed promising results in early clinical studies.

Since then, Ga-PSMA has been extensively studied in clinical trials, and it has been found to be a highly effective imaging agent for detecting prostate cancer lesions. It is now widely used in clinical practice, particularly for patients with recurrent prostate cancer and those with high-risk disease.

Initially gallium (^{68}Ga) chloride solution injections used for radiolabelling, in 2019 European Pharmacopoeia mentions gallium (^{68}Ga) DOTATOC injection for radiolabelling and PET imaging.

Ga 68 PSMA-11 was co-developed by researchers at University of California, Los Angeles and University of California, San Francisco, who conducted a phase III clinical trial. In December 2020, the drug was first approved by the US Food and Drug Administration (FDA) for PET imaging.

== Mechanism of action ==
Gallium (^{68}Ga) gozetotide binds with prostate-specific membrane antigen (PSMA). This binds to cells that express PSMA, including malignant prostate cancer cells. The radioactive isotope of gallium, ^{68}Ga is responsible for emitting β+ radiations and X-rays. This helps in recording images by positron emission tomography (PET) and CT scan.

== Society and culture ==
=== Legal status ===
On 13 October 2022, the Committee for Medicinal Products for Human Use (CHMP) of the European Medicines Agency (EMA) adopted a positive opinion, recommending the granting of a marketing authorization for the medicinal product Locametz, intended for the diagnosis of prostate cancer. The applicant for this medicinal product is Novartis Europharm Limited. Locametz was approved for medical use in the European Union in December 2022.

=== Names ===
Gallium (^{68}Ga) gozetotide is the international nonproprietary name (INN).
