= Technetium (99mTc) mertiatide =

Chemical compound

Technetium (^{99m}Tc) mertiatide

Clinical data
- Trade names: Technescan Mag3
- License data: US DailyMed: Tc 99m mertiatide
- Routes of administration: Intravenous
- ATC code: V09CA03 (WHO)

Legal status
- Legal status: US: ℞-only

Identifiers
- CAS Number: 125224-05-7
- PubChem CID: 11441509
- ChemSpider: 32702040
- UNII: 36ITO9SKQJ
- KEGG: D06039

Chemical and physical data
- 3D model (JSmol): Interactive image; Interactive image
- SMILES: [Na+].O1C(=O)CN2C(=O)CN3C(=O)CN4C(=O)CS[99Tc-2]1234=O.[Na+]; [Na+].O=[99Tc-2]1234N(CC(=O)O3)C(=O)CN2C(=O)CN4C(=O)CS1.[Na+]
- InChI: InChI=1S/C8H13N3O5S.2Na.O.Tc/c12-5(2-10-7(14)4-17)9-1-6(13)11-3-8(15)16;;;;/h17H,1-4H2,(H,9,12)(H,10,14)(H,11,13)(H,15,16);;;;/q;2*+1;;+3/p-5/i;;;;1+1; Key:JVYYEQVAPXSUSY-RCUQKECRSA-I

Technetium (^{99m}Tc) mertiatide is a radiopharmaceutical medication used in nuclear medicine to image the kidneys. It is a renal imaging agent that is given by intravenous injection.

It was approved for medical use in the United States in June 1990.

== Medical uses ==
Technetium (^{99m}Tc) mertiatide is indicated for use in the diagnosis of congenital and acquired abnormalities, renal failure, urinary tract obstruction, and calculi.

== Chemistry ==
The active ingredient, betiatide, is reconstituted with sodium pertechnetate ^{99m}Tc injection to form technetium (^{99m}Tc) mertiatide.
