= Technetium (99mTc) mebrofenin =

Chemical compound

Technetium (^{99m}Tc) mebrofenin

Clinical data
- Trade names: Choletec
- AHFS/Drugs.com: FDA Professional Drug Information
- ATC code: V09DA04 (WHO)

Legal status
- Legal status: US: ℞-only

Identifiers
- IUPAC name: Bis(2-[[2-(3-bromo-2,4,6-trimethylanilino)-2-oxoethyl]-(carboxymethyl)amino]acetate) technetium (^{99m}Tc)
- CAS Number: 1415247-71-0
- PubChem CID: 11431716
- DrugBank: DB09137
- ChemSpider: 9606591
- UNII: F2NQ468L52

Chemical and physical data
- Formula: ^{99m}Tc^{3+}(C_{15}H_{17}BrN_{2}O_{5})^{2−}_{2}
- Molar mass: 869.3 g/mol
- 3D model (JSmol): Interactive image
- SMILES: Cc3c(Br)c(C)cc(C)c3NC(=O)CN(CC(=O)O1)CC(=O)O[99Tc-]12OC(=O)CN(CC(=O)O2)CC(=O)Nc4c(C)cc(C)c(Br)c4C
- InChI: InChI=1S/C15H19BrN2O5.Tc/c1-8-4-9(2)15(10(3)14(8)16)17-11(19)5-18(6-12(20)21)7-13(22)23;/h4H,5-7H2,1-3H3,(H,17,19)(H,20,21)(H,22,23);/i;1+1; Key:JLJSYHOPCNWUNE-IEOVAKBOSA-N

Technetium (^{99m}Tc) mebrofenin is a diagnostic radiopharmaceutical used for imaging of the liver and the gallbladder. Under the brand name Choletec it is available from Bracco Diagnostic. Supplied as a sterile kit of mebrofenin and dehydrated stannous fluoride. The vial is reconstituted with 1 to 5 mL up to 3.7 gigabecquerels (100 mCi) of sodium pertechnetate solution to form the final radio labeled ^{99m}Tc mebrofenin.

Upon intravenous administration, ^{99m}Tc mebrofenin bound to plasma proteins is cleared from systemic circulation in approximately 5 minutes by hepatocytes, while maximal liver uptake occurs within 11 minutes. Mechanism of mebrofenin entering the gallbladder is thought to occur with a mechanism similar to bilirubin clearance.

Normal adult patient (70 kg) dose with normal serum bilirubin levels of less than 1.5 mg/dL is 2 to 5 mCi. Increased serum bilirubin increases renal clearance, decreases hepatic uptake and increases visualization time, thus a higher dose of 3 to 10 mCi is recommended. Doses higher than 10 mCi are seldom used. Obese patients require increased dose of 2 to 3 mCi compared with the normal adult patient dose to obtain proper visualization.

== Structure ==
Mebrofenin is a chelate composed of two molecules of a lidocaine analogue, attached to a technetium-99m ion. All of the hepatobiliary visualization agents previous to mebrofenin have the same structural composition with changes only of the substituants on the phenyl ring of the lidocaine analogue molecules. Mebrofenin's fast hepatic excretion (t_{½}=17 minutes) and high hepatic uptake (98.1%) can be attributed to the 3-bromo-2,4,6-trimethylphenyl moiety.

To be a good hepatobiliary imaging agent, the chemical structure of mebrofenin has to meet certain requirements:

1. an organic ion with molecular weight between 300 and 1000
2. at least two aromatic rings in the molecule
3. ability to bind to albumin

In normal individuals, uptake of ^{99m}Tc mebrofenin by hepatocytes is 100%. Decreased liver uptake is indicative of hepatocyte disease. Once in the hepatocytes, ^{99m}Tc mebrofenin is secreted into the canaliculi and finally excreted by the bile ducts.

== Use ==
=== Liver ===
The two useful parameters gathered from hepatic uptake of ^{99m}Tc mebrofenin, to aid in determining severity of liver disease, is the hepatic extraction fraction (HEF) and excretion half-life. HEF is calculated by initial hepatocyte uptake divided by peak vascular uptake. HEF is 100% in normal individuals, in most patients remains close to 100% with partial common bile duct obstruction and in patients with sclerosing cholangitis, but is severely decreased in patients with Child-Pugh class C cirrhosis. Excretion half-life directly correlates with the degree of liver abnormality and can be a predictor of cirrhotic stage.

=== Gallbladder ===
Gallbladder visualization happens once all ^{99m}Tc mebrofenin has cleared the liver and enters the gall bladder, the common bile duct and finally the small intestines. Patients fasting for the normal requirement of 4 hours and have normal gallbladder function, the gallbladder is usually visualized within 60 minutes. If the gallbladder is not visualized in 60 minutes, the study can continue for up to 4 hours. To shorten the study, morphine sulfate (MS) can be injected into the patient to increase uptake of ^{99m}Tc mebrofenin into the gallbladder. If after 30 minutes of MS administration, the gallbladder is still not visualized, acute cholecystitis can be assumed with greater than 93% specificity.

To aid gall bladder emptying, a synthetic cholecystokinin (trade name Kinavec) can be administered. Situations when gall bladder emptying is indicated:

1. If a patient is suspected to have acute cholecystitis. Acute cholecystitis requires full visualization of the gall bladder, its associated duct work and the surrounding areas. Because a full gallbladder concentrates radioactive tracers, emptying the gallbladder will increase the probability of correctly identifying the cause of the problem.
2. If gall bladder ejection fraction (GBEF) is to be obtained because patient is suspected to have chronic cholecystitis without gall stones. Decreased GBEF may be indicative of asymptomatic cholelithiasis, which is usually without gallbladder pain. Only pain during gallbladder contraction/emptying and low GBEF can be associated with chronic cholecystitis.

== Precautions ==
- False positives can be due to administration of MS or meperidine prior to the study, patient in sepsis or if fasting requirements are ignored.
- The substance is excreted into the human milk.
- The prepared kit must be used within 18 hours of addition of ^{99m}Tc.
