= Technetium (99mTc) sulesomab =

Chemical compound

Technetium (^{99m}Tc) sulesomab
Monoclonal antibody
- Type: Fab' fragment
- Source: Mouse
- Target: NCA-90 (granulocyte cell antigen)

Clinical data
- ATC code: V09HA04 (WHO)

Legal status
- Legal status: AU: Approved

Identifiers
- CAS Number: 167747-19-5
- ChemSpider: none
- UNII: 709B6VM65P

Technetium (^{99m}Tc) sulesomab (trade name LeukoScan) is a radio-pharmaceutical composed of anti-human mouse monoclonal antibody that targets the granulocyte associated NCA-90 cell antigen and a conjugated technetium-99m radionuclide. After intravenous administration, Leukoscan enables sensitive and specific whole body measurement of granulocyte infiltration and activation by gamma camera imaging of ^{99m}Tc-antibody bound cells. Total clearance of LeukoScan from blood samples after administration and imaging has been reported at 48 hour time points indicating limited retention of the agent in circulation

It is approved in European markets for the imaging of infections and inflammations in patients with suspected osteomyelitis but has not secured FDA approval for use in American markets. In addition to approved uses, LeukoScan is currently being investigated for other diagnostic purposes like the detection of soft tissue infections, malignant external otitis and prosthetic joint infection. However, the future clinical and investigational use of this agent may be limited as sale of the agent by the parent company Immunomedics was discontinued in 2018.
