= Active surveillance of prostate cancer =

Method for monitoring cancer progression

Active surveillance is a management option for localized prostate cancer that can be offered to appropriate patients who would also be candidates for aggressive local therapies (surgery and radiotherapy), with the intent to intervene if the disease progresses. Active surveillance should not be confused with watchful waiting, another observational strategy for men who would not be candidates for curative therapy (surgery, radiation) because of a limited life expectancy.

Active surveillance offers men with a prostate cancer that is thought to have a low risk of causing harm in the absence of treatment, a chance to delay or avoid aggressive treatment and its associated side effects. While prostate cancer is the most common non-cutaneous cancer and second leading cause of cancer-related death in American men, it is conservatively estimated that approximately 100,000 men per year in the United States who would be eligible for conservative treatment through active surveillance, undergo unnecessary treatments. The management of localized prostate cancer is controversial and men with localized disease diagnosed today often undergo treatments with significant side effects that will not improve overall health outcomes.

The 2011 NIH State-of-the-Science Conference Statement on the "Role of active surveillance in the management of men with localized prostate cancer" pointed out the many unanswered questions about observational strategies for prostate cancer that require further research and clarification. These included:

- Improvements in the accuracy and consistency of pathologic diagnosis of prostate cancer
- Consensus on which men are the most appropriate candidates for active surveillance
- The optimal protocol for active surveillance and the potential for individualizing the approach based on clinical and patient factors
- Optimal ways to communicate the option of active surveillance to patients
- Methods to assist patient decision-making
- Reasons for acceptance or rejection of active surveillance as a treatment strategy
- Short- and long-term outcomes of active surveillance

The consensus statement highlighted the need for well-designed studies to address these questions as an important health research priority. In the meantime, active surveillance for the treatment of low risk prostate cancer is now being offered to more and more patients where it is generally considered that prostate cancer will not cause the man harm during his lifetime if treatment is delayed or avoided. For these men, surveillance is thought to offer a more targeted approach to management; avoiding unnecessary treatment and its risk of associated side effects, while allowing for curative intervention for those that experience disease progression on observation.

== History of prostate cancer in the era of prostate-specific antigens ==
Prostate-specific antigen based screening for prostate cancer led to earlier detection of prostate cancer (stage migration), and thus altered the course of the disease in the absence of treatment (natural history). Identifying the incidence and prevalence of prostate cancer increased with widespread prostate-specific antigen testing, as did the length of time that men live with their disease, as compared to the pre prostate-specific antigen era. The stage migration that occurred, with application of curative intervention at an earlier stage, undoubtedly led to a reduction in prostate cancer mortality. However, the extent to which this reduction was due to prostate-specific antigen based screening is debatable. Further, because prostate cancer progresses slowly and is found most often in older men with competing risks of mortality, the extent to which these changes in natural history have resulted in benefit and harm are also debatable.

=== Observational studies ===
The outcomes of men with moderately differentiated (Gleason scores 5–7) and poorly differentiated (Gleason scores 8–10) cancers managed without treatment (watchful waiting), was compared in the prostate cancer screening era (1992–2002) and pre prostate cancer screening era (prior to 1992). The rate of death from prostate cancer at 10 years for men age 65–74 years with moderately differentiated cancers (Gleason score 5–7) diagnosed with screening (in the prostate cancer screening era) and pre prostate cancer screening eras (without screening) were from 2-6%, and from 15 to 23%, respectively. For men with poorly differentiated cancers the 10-year cancer death rates in the prostate cancer screening and pre PSA eras was from 25 to 38% and from 50 to 66%, respectively. In a separate study of men from the pre prostate cancer screening era managed with watchful waiting (56% over age 70 years), progression to distant metastasis or prostate cancer death was 13.9% and 12.3%, respectively for Gleason score 6 or below, but considerably higher at 18.2 and 22.7%, 30% and 20%, 44.4% and 55.6% for Gleason 3+4, 4+3, and 8–10, respectively. It has been estimated that the 15 year rate of death from prostate cancers detected through screening would be 0-2% for men age 55–74 years with Gleason score 6 or less managed without treatment. These low grade prostate cancers make up 60-70% of the cancers found with prostate-specific antigen based screening.

=== Randomized studies ===
The control arm (untreated) of randomized trials comparing surgery to watchful waiting represents an opportunity for evaluating the natural history of prostate cancer. The Scandinavian Prostate Cancer Group Study-4 (SPGS-4) randomized 695 men (mean age 65 years) to observation versus radical prostatectomy; 5% were diagnosed through PSA based screening, 3 of 4 had palpable disease, and the mean PSA level was 13 ng/ml at diagnosis. Recognizing that these men differ from those diagnosed today with PSA screening, the cumulative incidence of death from prostate cancer was 20.7% in the untreated group overall, and 11% for men with low risk disease (PSA below 10 ng/ml and Gleason score below 7) - similar to the cumulative incidence of death from prostate cancer of 12.3% at 30 years for men with Gleason score 6 cancers managed conservatively in the Swedish observational study cited above.

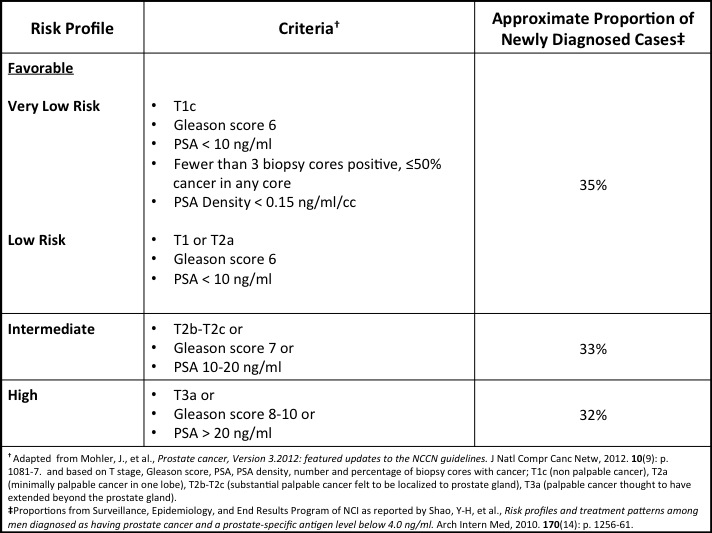

The Prostate Cancer Intervention versus Observation Trial (PIVOT) randomized 731 men diagnosed with localized prostate cancer to radical prostatectomy or observation (mean age 67 years; median PSA 7.8 ng/ml). In the observation group, bone metastases and prostate cancer death occurred in 10.6% and 8.4%, respectively through 12 years. Death from prostate cancer occurred in 5.7% and 17.4% of men diagnosed with Gleason score below 7 and 7 and above, respectively; and 6.2% and 12.8% of men with a PSA of 10 ng/ml or below and above 10 ng/ml, respectively. Stratified by D’Amico risk groups (see Prostate Cancer Risk Stratification Table at right for explanation), death from prostate cancer occurred in 2.7%, 10.8%, and 17.5% of men with low, intermediate, and high risk disease, respectively.

== Rationale for non-curative management of prostate cancer ==
PSA based screening and treatment of prostate cancer at a localized stage can prevent prostate cancer death for some men. However, if curative intervention is the downstream consequence of every screen detected prostate cancer, a large proportion of men will undergo unnecessary treatment and experience functional declines in quality of life due to the side effects of treatment.

=== Functional outcomes and quality of life after treatment for localized prostate cancer ===
At 15 years after treatment (radiotherapy or surgery) of localized prostate cancer diagnosed in 1994–1995, declines in urinary, sexual, and bowel function were common. These functional declines in quality of life occur to a significantly greater extent among those that undergo treatment for prostate cancer as compared to a normative aging population without a diagnosis of prostate cancer, and symptom distress is more common among men with prostate cancer that are treated compared to those not treated. In a contemporary study of quality of life after treatment (radiotherapy and surgery) for localized prostate cancer, the authors reported that a substantial proportion of men did not return to baseline function in the domains of bowel, sexual, and urinary function; that changes in quality of life domains were treatment specific; and that patient and partner outcome satisfaction were closely associated with changes in quality of life after treatment.

=== Risks of over treatment of prostate cancer ===
Over diagnosis is the detection of a cancer that would otherwise not have been diagnosed in the lifetime of the host if the detection test (e.g., PSA and/or prostate biopsy) had not been performed. Treatment of men who would otherwise not have known about their cancer in the absence of PSA testing and biopsy are over treated. Over treatment exacts a cost to the health care system and potential harm to a patient (decrease in quality of life), with no benefit. Over treatment is most likely to occur when a low grade prostate cancer is detected, especially in an older man. Data from various sources suggest that in the PSA range where many men are undergoing prostate biopsy today (PSA 2-4 ng/ml), 15-25% will have prostate cancer detected, and 80-90% will be low grade.

The rate of overtreatment in the U.S. is similar to the rate of over diagnosis since the majority of men undergo curative intervention after receiving a prostate cancer diagnosis. A range of estimates of over diagnosis between 23% and 42% have been reported based on U.S. incidence. Depending upon the age at diagnosis, and the disease characteristics, the likelihood that a screen detected cancer has been over diagnosed can vary from below 5% to more than 75%.

An unintended consequence of new technology is its use among those least likely to benefit. A disturbing trend has been noted in men with newly diagnosed prostate cancer treated with robotic surgery and newer forms of radiotherapy (IMRT). A 2013 study reported that the use of advanced treatment technologies had increased among men in the Medicare population least likely to benefit from treatment, despite increasing awareness of the extent of over treatment for low risk disease. Even among the elderly, treatment rates for low risk prostate cancer are high; 59%, 36.6%, and 15.8% of patients age 75 and 79 years, 80 and 84 years, and more than or equal to 85 years were initially treated with radiation therapy in one study using Medicare data. These data highlight an important disconnect between evidence and practice given the results from randomized trials comparing treatment to no treatment (see Comparative outcomes of surgery and observation for prostate cancer below).

=== Comparative outcomes of surgery and observation for prostate cancer ===
The Scandinavian Prostate Cancer Group Study 4 (SPCG-4), cited previously, compared radical prostatectomy to watchful waiting among men (mean age 65 years) with localized prostate cancer diagnosed in the era prior to PSA screening. After 15 years of follow-up, men that underwent surgical treatment had significantly lower rates of distant metastatic disease and death from prostate cancer. This benefit of surgery was seen only among men below age 65 years, but not in those age 65 years and above in whom surgery did not provide a benefit in terms of freedom from metastatic disease or prostate cancer death.

The PSA era Prostate Cancer Intervention versus Observation Trial (PIVOT), compared radical prostatectomy to watchful waiting among 731 men (mean age 67 years) with localized prostate cancer. At 12 years, a subset of men with a PSA above 10 ng/ml and those with intermediate to high risk disease had a reduction in prostate cancer death with surgery as compared to watchful waiting.

The findings from the SPGS-4 and PIVOT should inform practice for the older man with low risk disease, especially those with associated comorbidities unlikely to benefit from curative intervention. For these men, no treatment may be the most rational initial management considering that harm (quality of life decrement) is likely to outweigh any benefit (prostate cancer mortality reduction).

=== Identification of candidates for observation ===
Selection of patients for active surveillance depends upon patient and tumor metrics, as well as a patient's personal preferences. The age, comorbidities, and estimated life expectancy of the patient are important to consider given that prostate cancer can be a slowly progressive disease that may not have time to progress in those whose remaining years of life are limited. In this respect, tools for estimating life expectancy can be useful in decision making.

In terms of tumor metrics, natural history studies clearly demonstrate that Gleason score is a powerful predictor of the risk of disease progression and dissemination. It is therefore essential that the diagnosis reflect an accurate grade. For this, MRI-guided targeted biopsies may be superior to conventional TRUS-guided systematic biopsies; a National Institutes of Health study comparing the two biopsy approaches demonstrated that targeted biopsy results led to upgraded TRUS biopsy Gleason scores in 32% of cases, which could rule active surveillance out for those patients. In addition, the supplemental risk factor information provided by both stage and PSA at diagnosis should be included in making an active surveillance decision (see table above). Finally, the preference of a patient for living with cancer or side effects of treatment should be considered in decision making. Patients with similar disease characteristics for whom both observation and curative intervention might be reasonable, may have differing personal preferences. For some, willingness to accept a decline in quality of life to be rid of a cancer that has minimal chance of causing harm over a decade or more may seem reasonable; while others would rather live with a cancer and maintain their quality of life. An understanding of a patient's personal preferences should play a large part in shared decision making.

Active surveillance as a management option for localized prostate cancer is offered to appropriate candidates that could also be offered aggressive local therapies (surgery and radiotherapy) with the intent to intervene if the disease progresses. Active surveillance is not recommended for men with high-risk disease, or those with primary Gleason pattern 4 or 5, who have a substantial risk of harboring systemic disease at diagnosis, and of progression to metastatic disease in the absence of treatment. However, active surveillance should be considered for those with very low, low, and intermediate risk prostate cancer (see table above) depending on overall health state and life expectancy, as well as personal preferences. The National Comprehensive Cancer Center Guidelines recommend active surveillance as the preferred management option for men with very low risk disease and a life expectancy below 20 years, and those with low risk disease and a life expectancy below 10 years; and an option for those with low risk disease and a life expectancy of 10 years or more, or intermediate risk disease and a life expectancy less than 10 years.

=== Definition of progression and triggers for intervention on active surveillance ===
Most urologists will monitor a patient on surveillance with PSA and digital rectal examination at least biannually, and perform surveillance prostate biopsies at 1-2 year intervals. However, defining disease progression is problematic. Progression in active surveillance programs has been defined based on PSA kinetics or exceeding a given PSA threshold, increased extent of cancer or higher grade disease on prostate biopsy, change in digital rectal examination, and proceeding to curative intervention. Yet, PSA changes and exceeding a given threshold PSA value may not reflect progression of disease. A change in stage or digital rectal examination findings is unusual among patients with low risk disease.

== The future of active surveillance ==
Improvements in prostate imaging, biomarker discovery, and genetic profiling of prostate cancers will very likely change the approach to management of men diagnosed with localized prostate cancer. Currently, active surveillance is underutilized (in part) because of the dual concerns that a cancer has been misclassified on a prostate biopsy, and the inability to define biologically which cancers have an aggressive phenotype. Thus, there is both overtreatment of indolent disease and undertreatment of aggressive disease. In the future it is likely that men with newly diagnosed localized prostate cancer will have had an assessment of the prostate using MRI, targeted biopsies of lesions considered suspicious, and gene expression signatures that focus on profiling the cancer based on molecular pathways associated with aggressiveness. Together with serum and urine biomarkers, this new paradigm may enhance our current stratification systems that rely to a great extent on light microscopic grading. This multidimensional approach may improve the ability to select the most appropriate candidates for surveillance and our ability to longitudinally monitor specific lesions within the prostate for evidence of disease progression. A number of centers are actively enrolling men in active surveillance programs and have published results on this management strategy for prostate cancer. These include the Active Surveillance Program at the James Buchanan Brady Urological Institute of the Johns Hopkins Medical Institutions, the University of Toronto, and UCSF, all of which started in the early 1990s; the multi-institutional, University of Miami, Prostate Cancer Research International Active Surveillance (PRIAS), Royal Marsden, Memorial Sloan Kettering.
