= Fluorocholine =

Chemical compound

- Structure of fluorocholine chloride

Clinical data
- Other names: N,N-dimethyl-N-fluoromethyl-2-hydroxyethylammonium, FCH
- Routes of administration: intravenous
- ATC code: V09IX07 (WHO) (^{18}F)

Identifiers
- IUPAC name: Fluoromethyl-(2-hydroxyethyl)-dimethylazanium chloride
- CAS Number: 44580-38-3
- PubChem CID: 404591
- ChemSpider: 358328
- UNII: 6029HGL0QP
- CompTox Dashboard (EPA): DTXSID10197197

Chemical and physical data
- Formula: C_{5}H_{13}ClFNO
- Molar mass: 157.61 g·mol^{−1}
- 3D model (JSmol): Interactive image
- SMILES: C[N+](C)(CCO)CF.[Cl-]
- InChI: InChI=1S/C5H13FNO.ClH/c1-7(2,5-6)3-4-8;/h8H,3-5H2,1-2H3;1H/q+1;/p-1; Key:QJEHIIJVWXGJAB-UHFFFAOYSA-M

[^{18}F]Fluorocholine, also known as fluorocholine chloride, is a fluorinated choline derivative and an oncologic PET tracer.
