= Ammonia (13N) =

Chemical compound

Ammonia (^{13}N)

Clinical data
- ATC code: V09GX05 (WHO)

Legal status
- Legal status: US: ℞-only

Identifiers
- IUPAC name: (^{13}N)azane
- CAS Number: 34819-78-8
- PubChem CID: 119432
- DrugBank: DB09326
- ChemSpider: 106665
- UNII: 9OQO0E343Z
- ChEBI: CHEBI:135980
- ChEMBL: ChEMBL1201189
- CompTox Dashboard (EPA): DTXSID601027603 DTXSID50930606, DTXSID601027603

Chemical and physical data
- Formula: H3[^{13}N]
- 3D model (JSmol): Interactive image
- SMILES: [13NH3]
- InChI: InChI=1S/H3N/h1H3/i1-1; Key:QGZKDVFQNNGYKY-BJUDXGSMSA-N

Ammonia (^{13}N) (ammonia with radioisotope nitrogen-13) is a medication for diagnostic positron emission tomography (PET) imaging of the myocardium.
