= Technetium (99mTc) tetrofosmin =

Chemical compound

Technetium (^{99m}Tc) tetrofosmin

Clinical data
- Routes of administration: Intravenous
- ATC code: V09GA02 (WHO)

Pharmacokinetic data
- Bioavailability: N/A

Identifiers
- CAS Number: 127455-27-0 127502-06-1 (tetrofosmin)
- DrugBank: DB09160
- UNII: 42FOP1YX93
- CompTox Dashboard (EPA): DTXSID70155576

Chemical and physical data
- Formula: C_{36}H_{80}O_{10}P_{4}Tc
- Molar mass: 895 g·mol^{−1}
- 3D model (JSmol): Interactive image
- SMILES: CCOCC[P+]1(CCOCC)CC[P+](CCOCC)(CCOCC)[99Tc-4]12([P+](CCOCC)(CCOCC)CC[P+]2(CCOCC)CCOCC)(=O)=O

Technetium (^{99m}Tc) tetrofosmin is a drug used in nuclear medicine cardiac imaging. It is sold under the brand name Myoview (GE Healthcare). The radioisotope, technetium-99m, is chelated by two 1,2-bis[di-(2-ethoxyethyl)phosphino]ethane ligands which belong to the group of diphosphines and which are referred to as tetrofosmin.

Tc-99m tetrofosmin is rapidly taken up by myocardial tissue and reaches its maximum level in approximately 5 minutes. About 66% of the total injected dose is excreted within 48 hours after injection (40% urine, 26% feces). Tc-99m tetrofosmin is indicated for use in scintigraphic imaging of the myocardium under stress and rest conditions. It is used to determine areas of reversible ischemia and infarcted tissue in the heart. It is also indicated to detect changes in perfusion induced by pharmacologic stress (adenosine, lexiscan, dobutamine or persantine) in patients with coronary artery disease. Its third indication is to assess left ventricular function (ejection fraction) in patients thought to have heart disease. No contraindications are known for use of Tc-99m tetrofosmin, but care should be taken to constantly monitor the cardiac function in patients with known or suspected coronary artery disease. Patients should be encouraged to void their bladders as soon as the images are gathered, and as often as possible after the tests to decrease their radiation doses, since the majority of elimination is renal. The recommended dose of Tc-99m tetrofosmin is between 5 and 33 millicuries (185-1221 megabecquerels). For a two-dose stress/rest dosing, the typical dose is normally a 10 mCi dose, followed one to four hours later by a dose of 30 mCi. Imaging normally begins 15 minutes following injection.
