= Iodine (125I) human albumin =

Iodinated I-125 human serum albumin

Iodine (^{125}I) human albumin
Clinical data
- Trade names: Jeanatope
- AHFS/Drugs.com: FDA Professional Drug Information
- Routes of administration: Intravenous injection
- ATC code: V09GB02 (WHO)

Legal status
- Legal status: US: ℞-only

Pharmacokinetic data
- Elimination half-life: ~14 days
- Excretion: via kidneys

Identifiers
- PubChem SID: 17396952
- DrugBank: DB09429
- UNII: 68WQQ3N9TI
- KEGG: D02794

Iodine (^{125}I) human albumin (trade name Jeanatope) is human serum albumin iodinated with iodine-125, typically injected to aid in the determination of total blood and plasma volume.

Iodine-131 iodinated albumin (trade name Volumex) is used for the same purposes.

== Medical uses ==
Iodine (^{125}I) human albumin is used to determine a person's blood volume. For this purpose, a defined amount of radioactivity in form of this drug is injected into a vein, and blood samples are drawn from a different body location after five and fifteen minutes. From the radioactivity of these samples, the original radioactivity per blood volume can be calculated; and knowing the total amount of radioactivity injected, one can calculate the total blood volume.

It can also be used to calculate the blood plasma volume using a similar method. The main difference is that the drawn blood sample has to be centrifuged to separate the plasma from the blood cells.

== Contraindications ==
The US Food and Drug Administration lists no contraindications for this drug.

== Adverse effects ==
There is a theoretical possibility of allergic reactions after repeated use of this medication.

== Pharmacokinetics ==
Iodine-125 is a radioactive isotope of iodine that decays by electron capture with a physical half-life of 60.14 days. The biological half-life in normal individuals for iodine (^{125}I) human albumin has been reported to be approximately 14 days. Its radioactivity is excreted almost exclusively via the kidneys.
