= Piflufolastat (18F) =

Chemical compound

Piflufolastat (^{18}F)

Clinical data
- Trade names: Pylarify, Pylclari
- Other names: 18F-DCFPyL, piflufolastat F18 (USAN US)
- AHFS/Drugs.com: Micromedex Detailed Consumer Information
- License data: US DailyMed: Piflufolastat
- Routes of administration: Intravenous
- ATC code: V09IX16 (WHO)

Legal status
- Legal status: US: ℞-only; EU: Rx-only

Identifiers
- CAS Number: 1207181-29-0
- PubChem CID: 52950901
- DrugBank: DB14805
- ChemSpider: 32702072
- UNII: 3934EF02T7
- KEGG: D12132
- ChEMBL: ChEMBL4297334

Chemical and physical data
- Formula: C_{18}H_{23}[^{18}F]N_{4}O_{8}
- Molar mass: 441.4 g/mol
- 3D model (JSmol): Interactive image
- SMILES: OC(=O)CC[C@H](NC(=O)N[C@@H](CCCCNC(=O)C1=CC=C([18F])N=C1)C(O)=O)C(O)=O
- InChI: InChI=1S/C18H23FN4O8/c19-13-6-4-10(9-21-13)15(26)20-8-2-1-3-11(16(27)28)22-18(31)23-12(17(29)30)5-7-14(24)25/h4,6,9,11-12H,1-3,5,7-8H2,(H,20,26)(H,24,25)(H,27,28)(H,29,30)(H2,22,23,31)/t11-,12-/m0/s1/i19-1; Key:OLWVRJUNLXQDSP-MVBOSPHXSA-N

Piflufolastat (^{18}F), sold under the brand name Pylarify among others, is a radioactive diagnostic agent used for positron emission tomography (PET) imaging. It is given by intravenous injection.

The most common adverse reactions include transcient headache, altered taste, and fatigue.

Piflufolastat (^{18}F) was approved for medical use in the United States in May 2021. It is the second PSMA-targeted PET imaging drug approved by the U.S. Food and Drug Administration (FDA). The first approved PSMA-targeted PET imaging drug is Ga 68 PSMA-11.

== Medical uses ==
Piflufolastat (^{18}F) is indicated for people with suspected prostate cancer metastasis (when cancer cells spread from the place where they first formed to another part of the body) who are potentially curable by surgery or other therapy. Piflufolastat (^{18}F) is also indicated for people with suspected prostate cancer recurrence based on elevated serum prostate-specific antigen (PSA) levels.

== History ==
The safety and efficacy of piflufolastat (^{18}F) were evaluated in two prospective clinical trials (trial 1/NCT02981368 and trial 2/NCT03739684) with a total of 593 men with prostate cancer who each received one injection of piflufolastat (^{18}F). In the first trial, a cohort of 268 participants with biopsy-proven prostate cancer underwent PET/CT scans performed with piflufolastat (^{18}F). These participants were candidates for surgical removal of the prostate gland and pelvic lymph nodes and were considered at higher risk for metastasis. Among the participants who proceeded to surgery, those with positive readings in the pelvic lymph nodes on piflufolastat (^{18}F) PET had a clinically important rate of metastatic cancer confirmed by surgical pathology.

The second trial enrolled 208 participants who had rising serum prostate-specific antigen levels after initial prostate surgery or other definitive therapy, and thus had biochemical evidence of recurrent prostate cancer. Prior to a single piflufolastat (^{18}F) PET/CT scan, all of these participants had baseline conventional imaging performed that did not show definite spread of prostate cancer. Piflufolastat (^{18}F) PET detected at least one positive lesion in at least one body region (bone, prostate bed, pelvic lymph node, other lymph nodes, or soft tissue) in 60% of these participants. In participants with positive piflufolastat (^{18}F) PET readings who had correlative tissue pathology from biopsies, results from baseline or follow-up imaging by conventional methods, or serial PSA levels available for comparison, local recurrence or metastasis of prostate cancer was confirmed in an estimated 85% to 87% of cases, depending on the reader. Thus, the second trial demonstrated that piflufolastat (^{18}F) PET can detect sites of disease in participants with biochemical evidence of recurrent prostate cancer, thereby providing important information that may impact the approach to therapy.

Trial 1 included two groups of participants, some with recently diagnosed prostate cancer and others with suspicious findings on standard tests. Trial 2 included participants who were treated for prostate cancer before, but there was suspicion that the cancer was spreading because of rising prostate-specific antigen. Participants in trial 2 and the recently diagnosed participants in trial 1 were studied for effectiveness of piflufolastat (^{18}F), and all participants were studied for safety. Trial 1 was conducted at eight sites in the United States and two sites in Canada, and trial 2 was conducted at thirteen sites in the United States and one site in Canada. The number of participants representing efficacy findings may differ from the number of participants representing safety findings due to different pools of study participants analyzed for efficacy and safety.

The US Food and Drug Administration (FDA) granted approval of Pylarify to Progenics Pharmaceuticals, Inc.
