= Technetium (99mTc) votumumab =

Chemical compound

Technetium (^{99m}Tc) votumumab
Monoclonal antibody
- Type: Whole antibody
- Source: Human
- Target: tumor antigen CTAA16.88

Clinical data
- ATC code: V09IA04 (WHO)

Identifiers
- CAS Number: 148189-70-2
- ChemSpider: none
- UNII: 63635D7SGF

Technetium (^{99m}Tc) votumumab (trade name HumaSPECT) is a human monoclonal antibody labelled with the radionuclide technetium-99m. It was developed for the detection of colorectal tumors, but has never been marketed.

The target of votumumab is CTAA16.88, a complex of cytokeratin polypeptides in the molecular weight range of 35 to 43 kDa, which is expressed in colorectal tumors.
