= Technetium (99mTc) pentetic acid =

Chemical compound

Technetium (^{99m}Tc) pentetic acid

Clinical data
- Trade names: Draximage DTPA
- License data: US DailyMed: Technetium tc 99m pentetate
- Routes of administration: Intravenous, inhalation
- ATC code: V09CA01 (WHO)

Legal status
- Legal status: US: ℞-only

Identifiers
- CAS Number: 65454-61-7
- PubChem CID: 73415750
- ChemSpider: 25016281
- UNII: VW78417PU1

Chemical and physical data
- Formula: C_{14}H_{18}N_{3}NaO_{10}Tc
- Molar mass: 509 g·mol^{−1}
- 3D model (JSmol): Interactive image
- SMILES: C(CN(CC(=O)[O-])CC(=O)[O-])N(CCN(CC(=O)[O-])CC(=O)[O-])CC(=O)[O-].[Na+].[99Tc+4]
- InChI: InChI=1S/C14H23N3O10.Na.Tc/c18-10(19)5-15(1-3-16(6-11(20)21)7-12(22)23)2-4-17(8-13(24)25)9-14(26)27;;/h1-9H2,(H,18,19)(H,20,21)(H,22,23)(H,24,25)(H,26,27);;/q;+1;+4/p-5; Key:VTPAYRVYYYAMJN-UHFFFAOYSA-I

Technetium (^{99m}Tc) pentetic acid, sold under the brand name Draximage DTPA among others, is a radiopharmaceutical medication used in nuclear medicine to image the brain, kidneys, or lungs. It is given by intravenous injection or via aerosol spray. It consists of technetium-99m bound to the conjugate base of pentetic acid, with sodium as an additional cation.

== Medical uses ==
Technetium (^{99m}Tc) pentetic acid is indicated for use in the diagnosis of the brain, kidneys, or lungs.
