= ATC code V09 =

Pharmaceutical drug classification

ATC code V09 Diagnostic radiopharmaceuticals is a therapeutic subgroup of the Anatomical Therapeutic Chemical Classification System, a system of alphanumeric codes developed by the World Health Organization (WHO) for the classification of drugs and other medical products. Subgroup V09 is part of the anatomical group V Various.

Codes for veterinary use (ATCvet codes) can be created by placing the letter Q in front of the human ATC code: for example, QV09.
National versions of the ATC classification may include additional codes not present in this list, which follows the WHO version.

== V09A Central nervous system ==
=== V09AA Technetium (^{99m}Tc) compounds ===
V09AA01 Technetium (^{99m}Tc) exametazime
V09AA02 Technetium (^{99m}Tc) bicisate

=== V09AB Iodine (^{123}I) compounds ===
V09AB01 Iodine iofetamine (^{123}I)
V09AB02 Iodine iolopride (^{123}I)
V09AB03 Iodine ioflupane (^{123}I)

=== V09AX Other central nervous system diagnostic radiopharmaceuticals ===
V09AX01 Indium (^{111}In) pentetic acid
V09AX03 Iodine (^{124}I) 2β-carbomethoxy-3β-(4-iodophenyl)-tropane
V09AX04 Flutemetamol (^{18}F)
V09AX05 Florbetapir (^{18}F)
V09AX06 Florbetaben (^{18}F)
V09AX07 Flortaucipir (^{18}F)

== V09B Skeleton ==
=== V09BA Technetium (^{99m}Tc) compounds ===
V09BA01 Technetium (^{99m}Tc) oxidronic acid
V09BA02 Technetium (^{99m}Tc) medronic acid

V09BA03 Technetium (^{99m}Tc) pyrophosphate

V09BA04 Technetium (^{99m}Tc) butedronic acid

== V09C Renal system ==
=== V09CA Technetium (^{99m}Tc) compounds ===
V09CA01 Technetium (^{99m}Tc) pentetic acid
V09CA02 Technetium (^{99m}Tc) succimer
V09CA03 Technetium (^{99m}Tc) mertiatide
V09CA04 Technetium (^{99m}Tc) gluceptate
V09CA05 Technetium (^{99m}Tc) gluconate
V09CA06 Technetium (^{99m}Tc) ethylenedicysteine

=== V09CX Other renal system diagnostic radiopharmaceuticals ===
V09CX01 Sodium iodohippurate (^{123}I)
V09CX02 Sodium iodohippurate (^{131}I)
V09CX03 Sodium iothalamate (^{125}I)
V09CX04 Chromium (^{51}Cr) edetate

== V09D Hepatic and reticulo endothelial system ==
=== V09DA Technetium (^{99m}Tc) compounds ===
V09DA01 Technetium (^{99m}Tc) disofenin
V09DA02 Technetium (^{99m}Tc) etifenin
V09DA03 Technetium (^{99m}Tc) lidofenin
V09DA04 Technetium (^{99m}Tc) mebrofenin
V09DA05 Technetium (^{99m}Tc) galtifenin

=== V09DB Technetium (^{99m}Tc), particles and colloids ===
V09DB01 Technetium (^{99m}Tc) nanocolloid
V09DB02 Technetium (^{99m}Tc) microcolloid
V09DB03 Technetium (^{99m}Tc) millimicrospheres
V09DB04 Technetium (^{99m}Tc) tin colloid
V09DB05 Technetium (^{99m}Tc) sulfur colloid
V09DB06 Technetium (^{99m}Tc) rheniumsulfide colloid
V09DB07 Technetium (^{99m}Tc) phytate

=== V09DX Other hepatic and reticulo endothelial system diagnostic radiopharmaceuticals ===
V09DX01 Selenium (^{75}Se) tauroselcholic acid

== V09E Respiratory system ==
=== V09EA Technetium (^{99m}Tc) inhalants ===
V09EA01 Technetium (^{99m}Tc) pentetic acid
V09EA02 Technetium (^{99m}Tc) technegas
V09EA03 Technetium (^{99m}Tc) nanocolloid

=== V09EB Technetium (^{99m}Tc) particles for injection ===
V09EB01 Technetium (^{99m}Tc) macrosalb
V09EB02 Technetium (^{99m}Tc) microspheres

=== V09EX Other respiratory system diagnostic radiopharmaceuticals ===
V09EX01 Krypton (^{81m}Kr) gas
V09EX02 Xenon (^{127}Xe) gas
V09EX03 Xenon (^{133}Xe) gas

== V09F Thyroid ==
=== V09FX Various thyroid diagnostic radiopharmaceuticals ===
V09FX01 Technetium (^{99m}Tc) pertechnetate
V09FX02 Sodium iodide (^{123}I)
V09FX03 Sodium iodide (^{131}I)
V09FX04 Sodium iodide (^{124}I)

== V09G Cardiovascular system ==
=== V09GA Technetium (^{99m}Tc) compounds ===
V09GA01 Technetium (^{99m}Tc) sestamibi
V09GA02 Technetium (^{99m}Tc) tetrofosmin
V09GA03 Technetium (^{99m}Tc) teboroxime
V09GA04 Technetium (^{99m}Tc) human albumin
V09GA05 Technetium (^{99m}Tc) furifosmin
V09GA06 Technetium (^{99m}Tc) stannous agent labelled cells
V09GA07 Technetium (^{99m}Tc) apcitide

=== V09GB Iodine (^{125}I) compounds ===
V09GB01 Fibrinogen (^{125}I)
V09GB02 Iodine (^{125}I) human albumin

=== V09GX Other cardiovascular system diagnostic radiopharmaceuticals ===
V09GX01 Thallium (^{201}Tl) chloride
V09GX02 Indium (^{111}In) imciromab
V09GX03 Chromium (^{51}Cr) chromate labelled cells
V09GX04 Rubidium (^{82}Rb) chloride
V09GX05 Ammonia (^{13}N)
V09GX06 Flurpiridaz (^{18}F)

== V09H Inflammation and infection detection ==
=== V09HA Technetium (^{99m}Tc) compounds ===
V09HA01 Technetium (^{99m}Tc) human immunoglobulin
V09HA02 Technetium (^{99m}Tc) exametazime labelled cells
V09HA03 Technetium (^{99m}Tc) antigranulocyte antibody
V09HA04 Technetium (^{99m}Tc) sulesomab

=== V09HB Indium (^{111}In) compounds ===
V09HB01 Indium (^{111}In) oxinate labelled cells
V09HB02 Indium (^{111}In) tropolonate labelled cells

=== V09HX Other diagnostic radiopharmaceuticals for inflammation and infection detection ===
V09HX01 Gallium (^{67}Ga) citrate

== V09I Tumour detection ==
=== V09IA Technetium (^{99m}Tc) compounds ===
V09IA01 Technetium (^{99m}Tc) antiCarcinoEmbryonicAntigen antibody
V09IA02 Technetium (^{99m}Tc) antimelanoma antibody
V09IA03 Technetium (^{99m}Tc) pentavalent succimer
V09IA04 Technetium (^{99m}Tc) votumumab
V09IA05 Technetium (^{99m}Tc) depreotide
V09IA06 Technetium (^{99m}Tc) arcitumomab
V09IA07 Technetium (^{99m}Tc) hynic-octreotide
V09IA08 Technetium (^{99m}Tc) etarfolatide
V09IA09 Technetium (^{99m}Tc) tilmanocept
V09IA10 Technetium (^{99m}Tc) trofolastat chloride

=== V09IB Indium (^{111}In) compounds ===
V09IB01 Indium (^{111}In) pentetreotide
V09IB02 Indium (^{111}In) satumomab pendetide
V09IB03 Indium (^{111}In) antiovariumcarcinoma antibody
V09IB04 Indium (^{111}In) capromab pendetide

=== V09IX Other diagnostic radiopharmaceuticals for tumour detection ===
V09IX01 Iobenguane (^{123}I)
V09IX02 Iobenguane (^{131}I)
V09IX03 Iodine (^{125}I) CC49-monoclonal antibody
V09IX04 Fludeoxyglucose (^{18}F)
V09IX05 Fluorodopa (^{18}F)
V09IX06 Sodium fluoride (^{18}F)
V09IX07 Fluorocholine (^{18}F)
V09IX08 Fluoroethylcholine (^{18}F)
V09IX09 Gallium (^{68}Ga) edotreotide
V09IX10 Fluoroethyl-L-tyrosine (^{18}F)
V09IX11 Fluoroestradiol (^{18}F)
V09IX12 Fluciclovine (^{18}F)
V09IX13 Methionine (^{11}C)
V09IX14 Gallium (^{68}Ga) gozetotide
V09IX15 Copper (^{64}Cu) oxodotreotide
V09IX16 Piflufolastat (^{18}F)
V09IX17 PSMA-1007 (^{18}F)
V09IX18 Flotufolastat (^{18}F)
V09IX19 Vidoflufolastat (^{18}F)

== V09X Other diagnostic radiopharmaceuticals ==
=== V09XA Iodine (^{131}I) compounds ===
V09XA01 Iodine (^{131}I) norcholesterol
V09XA02 Iodocholesterol (^{131}I)
V09XA03 Iodine (^{131}I) human albumin

=== V09XX Various diagnostic radiopharmaceuticals ===
V09XX01 Cobalt (^{57}Co) cyanocobalamine
V09XX02 Cobalt (^{58}Co) cyanocobalamine
V09XX03 Selenium (^{75}Se) norcholesterol
V09XX04 Ferric (^{59}Fe) citrate
