= Fluoroestradiol (18F) =

Chemical compound

Fluoroestradiol (^{18}F)
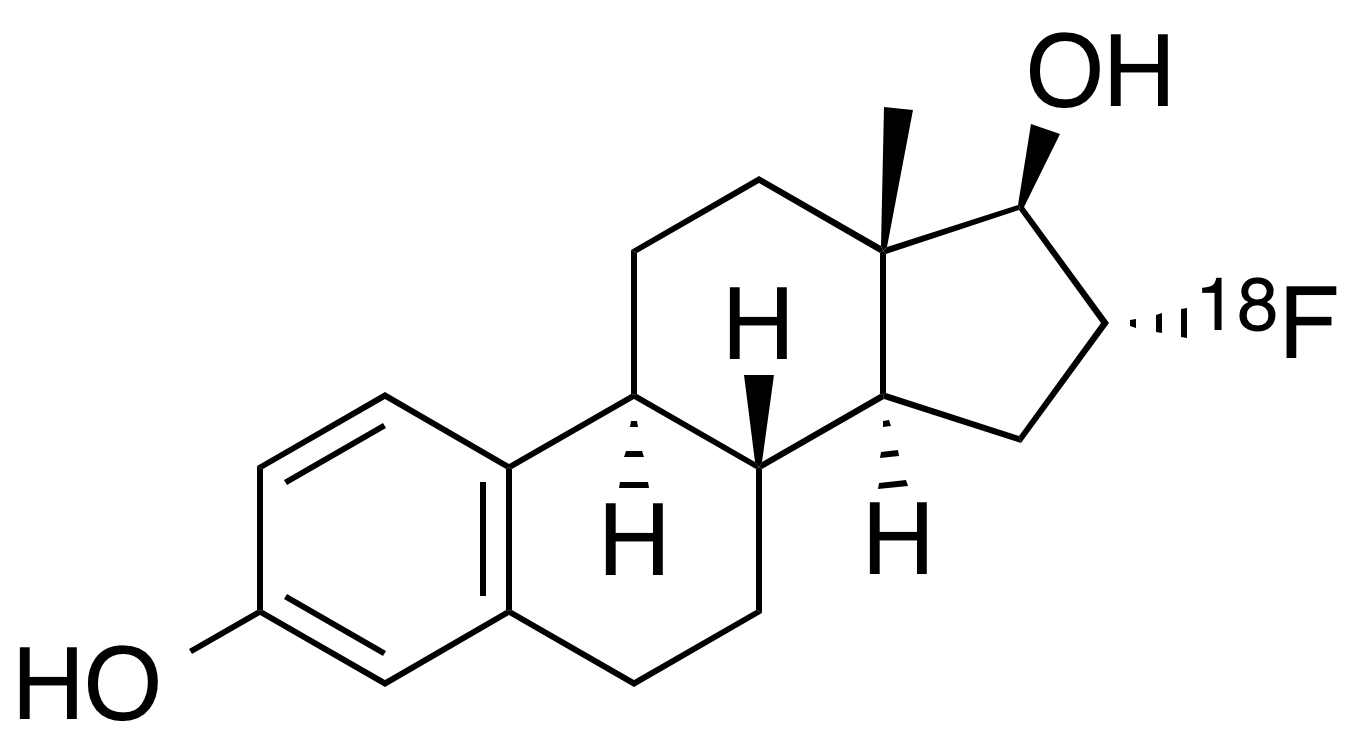

Clinical data
- Trade names: Cerianna
- Other names: [^{18}F]16α-Fluoroestradiol; [^{18}F]16α-Fluoroestra-1,3,5(10)-triene-3,17β-diol
- License data: US DailyMed: Fluoroestradiol
- Routes of administration: Intravenous injection
- Drug class: Estrogen; Diagnostic radiopharmaceutical
- ATC code: V09IX11 (WHO)

Legal status
- Legal status: US: ℞-only

Pharmacokinetic data
- Metabolism: Liver
- Excretion: Gallbladder and kidney

Identifiers
- IUPAC name: (8R,9S,13S,14S,16R,17R)-16-(18F)fluoranyl-13-methyl-6,7,8,9,11,12,14,15,16,17-decahydrocyclopenta[a]phenanthrene-3,17-diol
- CAS Number: 94153-53-4
- PubChem CID: 10869981
- ChemSpider: 9045262
- UNII: T32277KB09
- KEGG: D11829
- CompTox Dashboard (EPA): DTXSID101027872

Chemical and physical data
- Formula: C_{18}H_{23}[^{18}F]O_{2}
- Molar mass: 289.37
- 3D model (JSmol): Interactive image
- SMILES: C[C@]12CC[C@@]3([H])[C@](CCC4=C3C=CC(O)=C4)([H])C1C[C@@H]([18F])[C@@H]2O
- InChI: InChI=1S/C18H23FO2/c1-18-7-6-13-12-5-3-11(20)8-10(12)2-4-14(13)15(18)9-16(19)17(18)21/h3,5,8,13-17,20-21H,2,4,6-7,9H2,1H3/t13-,14-,15+,16-,17+,18+/m1/s1/i19-1; Key:KDLLNMRYZGUVMA-ZYMZXAKXSA-N

Fluoroestradiol F-18, also known as [^{18}F]16α-fluoroestradiol and sold under the brand name Cerianna, is a radioactive diagnostic agent indicated for use with positron emission tomography (PET) imaging. It is an analog of estrogen and is used to detect estrogen receptor-positive breast cancer lesions.

== Chemistry ==
Chemically, fluoroestradiol F-18 is [^{18}F]16α-fluoro-3,17β-diol-estratriene-1,3,5(10).

== History ==
Fluoroestradiol F-18 was approved for medical use in the United States in May 2020.
