= Technetium (99mTc) tilmanocept =

Pharmaceutical drug

Technetium (^{99m}Tc) tilmanocept

Clinical data
- Trade names: Lymphoseek
- Other names: technetium Tc 99m tilmanocept
- AHFS/Drugs.com: Micromedex Detailed Consumer Information
- License data: US DailyMed: Tilmanocept
- Pregnancy category: AU: C
- Routes of administration: Intradermal, subcutaneous, intratumor
- ATC code: V09IA09 (WHO)

Legal status
- Legal status: AU: S4 (Prescription only); UK: POM (Prescription only); US: ℞-only; EU: Rx-only

Pharmacokinetic data
- Elimination half-life: 1.75 to 3.05 hours at injection site

Identifiers
- IUPAC name: Dextran 3-[(2-aminoethyl)thio]propyl 17-carboxy-10,13,16-tris(carboxymethyl)-8-oxo-4-thia-7,10,13,16-tetraazaheptadec-1-yl 3-[[2-[[1-imino-2-(D-mannopyranosylthio)ethyl]amino]ethyl]thio]propyl ether technetium-99m complexes
- CAS Number: 1262984-82-6
- UNII: 8IHI69PQTC
- KEGG: D11543

Chemical and physical data
- Formula: (C_{6}H_{10}O_{5})_{n}(C_{19}H_{28}N_{4}O_{9}S^{99m}Tc)_{3–8}(C_{13}H_{24}N_{2}O_{5}S_{2})_{12–20}(C_{5}H_{11}NS)_{0–17}
- Molar mass: 15,281–23,454 g/mol

Technetium (^{99m}Tc) tilmanocept, sold under the brand name Lymphoseek, is a radiopharmaceutical diagnostic imaging agent used to locate lymph nodes which may be draining from tumors, and assist doctors in locating lymph nodes for removal during surgery.

The most common side effects include pain or irritation at the injection site.

It was approved for medical use in the United States in March 2013, and in the European Union in November 2014.

== Medical uses ==
In the US, technetium (^{99m}Tc) tilmanocept is indicated with or without scintigraphic imaging for lymphatic mapping using a handheld gamma counter to locate lymph nodes draining a primary tumor site in people with solid tumors for which this procedure is a component of intraoperative management; and guiding sentinel lymph node biopsy using a handheld gamma counter in people with clinically node negative squamous cell carcinoma of the oral cavity, breast cancer or melanoma.

In the EU, technetium (^{99m}Tc) tilmanocept is indicated for imaging and intraoperative detection of sentinel lymph nodes draining a primary tumor in adults with breast cancer, melanoma, or localized squamous cell carcinoma of the oral cavity. External imaging and intraoperative evaluation may be performed using a gamma detection device.

== History ==
The safety and effectiveness of technetium (^{99m}Tc) tilmanocept were established in two clinical trials of 332 participants with melanoma or breast cancer. All participants were injected with technetium (^{99m}Tc) tilmanocept and blue dye, another drug used to help locate lymph nodes.
