= Prostate cancer =

Male reproductive organ cancer

- Other names: Prostate carcinoma
- Diagram of prostate tumor pressing on urethra
- Specialty: Oncology, urology
- Symptoms: Typically none.; Sometimes: Trouble urinating, erectile dysfunction, or pain in the back/pelvis
- Usual onset: Age over 40
- Risk factors: Older age, family history, race
- Diagnostic method: PSA test; followed by tissue biopsy; (if needed)
- Differential diagnosis: Benign prostatic hyperplasia
- Treatment: Active surveillance; Prostatectomy; Radiation therapy; Hormone therapy; Chemotherapy
- Prognosis: Five-year survival rates range from 30 to 99%, depending on stage.
- Frequency: 0.005%

Prostate cancer is the uncontrolled growth of cells in the prostate, a gland in the male reproductive system below the bladder. Abnormal growth of prostate tissue is usually detected through screening tests, typically blood tests that check for prostate-specific antigen (PSA) levels. Those with high levels of PSA in their blood are at increased risk for developing prostate cancer.

Diagnosis requires a biopsy of the prostate. If cancer is present, the pathologist assigns a Gleason score; a higher score represents a more dangerous tumor. Medical imaging is performed to look for cancer that has spread outside the prostate. Based on the Gleason score, PSA levels, and imaging results, a cancer case is assigned a stage 1 to 4. A higher stage signifies a more advanced, more dangerous disease.

Most prostate tumors remain small and cause no health problems. These are managed with active surveillance, monitoring the tumor with regular tests to ensure it has not grown. Tumors more likely to be dangerous can be destroyed with radiation therapy or surgically removed by radical prostatectomy. Those whose cancer spreads beyond the prostate are treated with hormone therapy, which reduces levels of the androgens (masculinizing sex hormones) that prostate cells need to survive. Eventually, cancer cells can grow resistant to this treatment. This most-advanced stage of the disease, called castration-resistant prostate cancer, is treated with continued hormone therapy alongside the chemotherapy drug docetaxel.

Some tumors metastasize (spread) to other areas of the body, particularly the bones and lymph nodes. There, tumors cause severe bone pain, leg weakness or paralysis, and eventually death. Prostate cancer prognosis depends on how far the cancer has spread at diagnosis. Most men diagnosed have low-risk tumors confined to the prostate; 99% of them survive more than 10 years from their diagnoses. Tumors that have metastasized to distant body sites are most dangerous, with five-year survival rates of 30–40%.

The risk of developing prostate cancer increases with age; the average age of diagnosis is 67. Those with a family history of any cancer are more likely to have prostate cancer, particularly those who inherit cancer-associated variants of the BRCA2 gene. Each year, 1.2 million cases of prostate cancer are diagnosed, and 350,000 die of the disease, making it the second-leading cause of cancer and cancer death in men. One in eight men is diagnosed with prostate cancer in their lifetime, and one in forty dies of the disease.

Prostate tumors were first described in the mid-19th century, during surgeries on men with urinary obstructions. Initially, prostatectomy was the primary treatment for prostate cancer. By the mid-20th century, radiation treatments and hormone therapies were developed to improve prostate cancer treatment. The invention of hormone therapies for prostate cancer was recognized with the 1966 Nobel Prize to Charles Huggins and the 1977 Prize to Andrzej W. Schally.

== Signs and symptoms ==
Early prostate cancer usually causes no symptoms. As the cancer advances, it may cause erectile dysfunction, blood in the urine or semen, or trouble urinating, commonly including frequent urination and slow or weak urine stream. More than half of men over age 50 experience some form of urination problem, typically due to issues other than prostate cancer, such as benign prostatic hyperplasia (non-cancerous enlargement of the prostate).

Advanced prostate tumors can metastasize to nearby lymph nodes and bones, particularly in the pelvis, hips, spine, ribs, head, and neck. There, they can cause fatigue, unexplained weight loss, and back or bone pain that does not improve with rest. Metastases can damage the bones around them, and around a quarter of those with metastatic prostate cancer develop a bone fracture. Growing metastases can also compress the spinal cord, causing weakness in the legs and feet, or limb paralysis.

== Screening ==
Most cases of prostate cancer are diagnosed through screening tests, when tumors are too small to cause any symptoms. This is done through blood tests to measure levels of the protein prostate-specific antigen (PSA), which are elevated in those with enlarged prostates, whether due to prostate cancer or benign prostatic hyperplasia. The typical man's blood has around 1 nanogram (ng) of PSA per milliliter (mL) of blood tested. Those with PSA levels below average are very unlikely to develop dangerous prostate cancer over the next 8 to 10 years. Men with PSA levels above 4 ng/mL are at increased risk – around 1 in 4 will develop prostate cancer – and are often referred for a prostate biopsy. PSA levels over 10 ng/mL indicate an even higher risk: more than half of men in this group develop prostate cancer. Men with high PSA levels are often recommended to repeat the blood test four to six weeks later, as PSA levels can fluctuate unrelated to prostate cancer. Benign prostatic hyperplasia, prostate infection, recent ejaculation, and some urological procedures can increase PSA levels; taking 5α-reductase inhibitors can decrease PSA levels.

Those with elevated PSA may undergo secondary screening blood tests that measure subtypes of PSA and other molecules to predict the likelihood that a person will develop aggressive prostate cancer more effectively. Many measure "free PSA" – , the fraction of PSA unbound to other blood proteins, usually around 10% to 30%. Men who have a lower percentage of free PSA are more likely to have prostate cancer. Several common tests more accurately detect prostate cancer cases by also measuring subtypes of free PSA, including the Prostate Health Index (measures a fragment called −2proPSA) and 4K score (measures intact free PSA). Other tests measure blood levels of additional prostate-related proteins such as kallikrein-2 (also measured by 4K score), or urine levels of mRNA molecules common to prostate tumors like PCA3 and TMPRSS2 fused to ERG.

Several large studies have found that men screened for prostate cancer have a reduced risk of dying from the disease; however, detection of cancer cases that would not have otherwise impacted health can cause anxiety, and lead to unneeded biopsies and treatments, both of which can cause unwanted complications. Major national health organizations offer differing recommendations, attempting to balance the benefits of early diagnosis with the potential harms of treating people whose tumors are unlikely to impact health. Most medical guidelines recommend that men at high risk of prostate cancer (due to age, family history, ethnicity, or prior evidence of high blood PSA levels) be counseled on the risks and benefits of PSA testing, and be offered access to screening tests. Medical guidelines generally recommend against screening for men over age 70, or with a life expectancy of less than 10 years, as a newly diagnosed prostate cancer is unlikely to impact their natural lifespan. Uptake of screening varies by geography – more than 80% of men are screened in the US and Western Europe, 20% of men in Japan, and screening is rare in regions with a low Human Development Index.

== Diagnosis ==
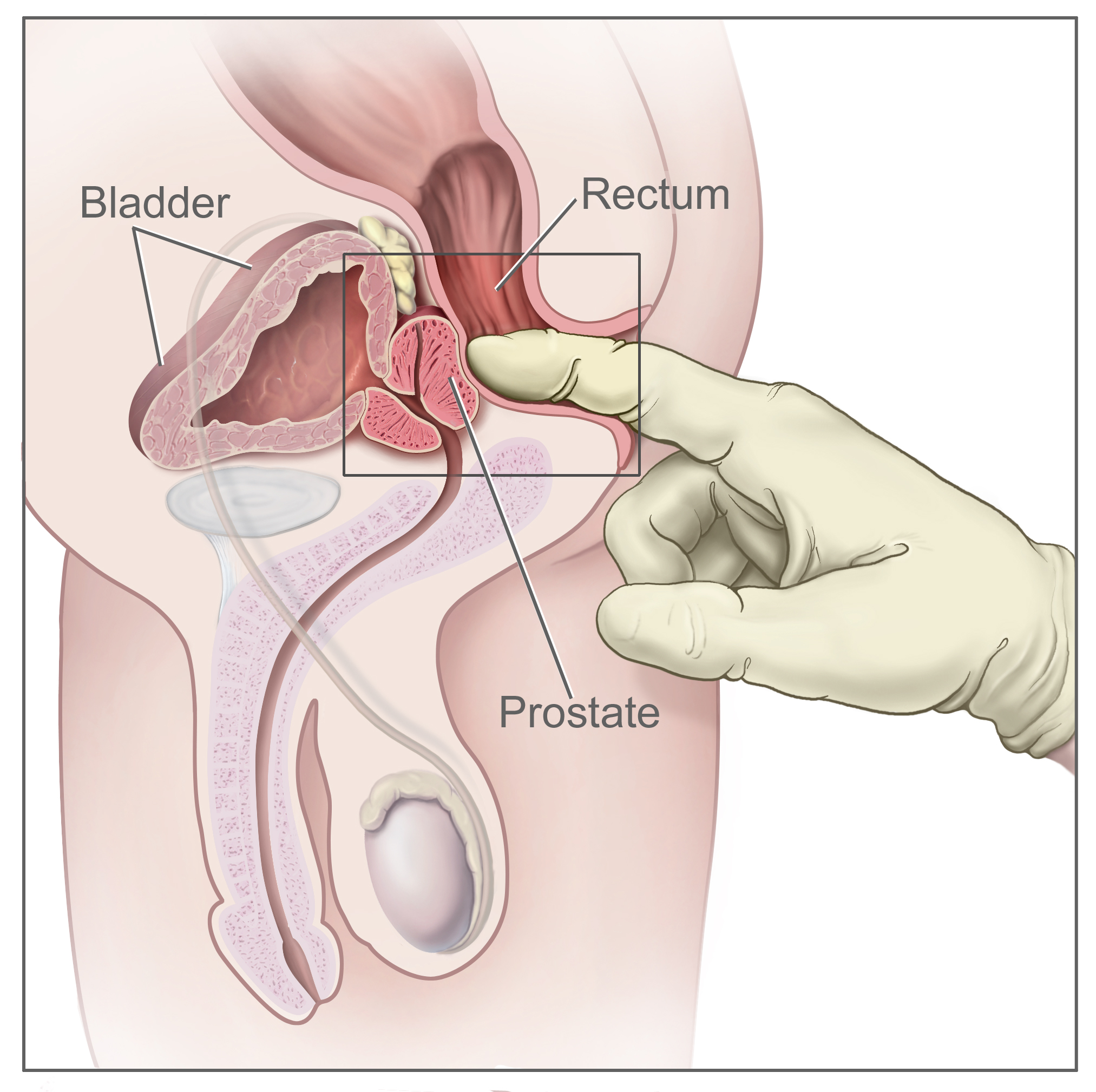
Diagram of a digital rectal exam

Men suspected of having prostate cancer may undergo several tests to assess the prostate. One common procedure is the digital rectal examination, in which a doctor inserts a lubricated finger into the rectum to feel the nearby prostate. Tumors feel like stiff, irregularly shaped lumps against the rest of the prostate. Hardening of the prostate can also be due to benign prostatic hyperplasia; around 20–25% of those with abnormal findings on their rectal exams have prostate cancer. Several urological societies' guidelines recommend magnetic resonance imaging (MRI) to evaluate the prostate for potential tumors in men with high PSA levels. MRI results can help distinguish those with potentially dangerous tumors from those without.

A definitive diagnosis of prostate cancer requires a biopsy of the prostate. Prostate biopsies are typically taken by a needle passing through the rectum or perineum, guided by transrectal ultrasonography, MRI, or a combination of the two. Ten to twelve samples are taken from several regions of the prostate to improve the chances of finding any tumors. Biopsies are sent for a histopathologic diagnosis of prostate cancer, wherein they are examined under a microscope by a pathologist, who determines the type and extent of cancerous cells present. Cancers are first classified based on their appearance under a microscope. More than 95% of prostate cancers are classified as adenocarcinomas (resembling gland tissue), with the rest largely squamous-cell carcinoma (resembling squamous cells, a type of epithelial cell) and transitional cell carcinoma (resembling transitional cells).

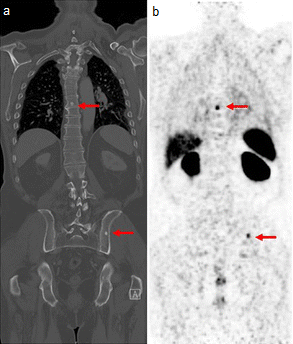
CT scan (left) and PSMA scan (right) showing prostate cancer metastases in the bone (red arrows). The dye used for PSMA scans is also absorbed by the kidneys, liver, and spleen (large dark objects at right).

Next, tumor samples are graded based on how much the tumor tissue differs from normal prostate tissue; the more different the tumor appears, the faster the tumor is likely to grow. The Gleason grading system is commonly used, where the pathologist assigns numbers ranging from 3 (most similar to healthy prostate tissue) to 5 (least similar) to different regions of the biopsied tissue. They then calculate a "Gleason score" by adding the two numbers that represent the largest areas of the biopsy sample. The lowest possible Gleason score of 6 represents a biopsy most similar to healthy prostate; the highest Gleason score of 10 represents the most severely cancerous. (Note: The original 1966 Gleason grading system allowed pathologist scores of 1 to 5, resulting in Gleason scores of 2 to 10; however, a 2005 update by the International Society of Urological Pathology largely eliminated the pathologist scores 1 and 2. In common practice, tumors are now scored 3 to 5, resulting in Gleason scores of 6 to 10.) Gleason scores are commonly grouped into "Gleason grade groups", which predict disease prognosis: a Gleason score of 6 is Gleason grade group 1 (best prognosis). A score of 7 (with Gleason scores 4 + 3, or Gleason scores 3 + 4, with the most prominent listed first) can be grade group 2 or 3; it is grade group 2 if the less severe Gleason score (3) covered more area; grade group 3 if the more severe Gleason score (4) covered more area. A score of 8 is grade group 4. A score of 9 or 10 is grade group 5 (worst prognosis).

The extent of cancer spread is assessed by MRI or PSMA scan – a positron emission tomography (PET) imaging technique where a radioactive label that binds the prostate protein prostate-specific membrane antigen is used to detect metastases distant from the prostate. CT scans may also be used, but are less able to detect spread outside the prostate than MRI. Bone scintigraphy is used to test for the spread of cancer to bones.

=== Staging ===
Diagram showing T1 to T3 stages of prostate cancer

After diagnosis, the tumor is staged to determine the extent of its growth and spread. Prostate cancer is typically staged using the American Joint Committee on Cancer's (AJCC) three-component TNM system, with scores assigned for the extent of the tumor (T), spread to any lymph nodes (N), and the presence of metastases (M). Scores of T1 and T2 represent tumors that remain within the prostate: T1 is for tumors not detectable by imaging or digital rectal exam; T2 is for tumors detectable by imaging or rectal exam, but still confined within the prostate. T3 is for tumors that grow beyond the prostate – T3a for tumors with any extension outside the prostate; T3b for tumors that invade the adjacent seminal vesicles. T4 is for tumors that have grown into organs beyond the seminal vesicles. The N and M scores are binary (yes or no). N1 represents any spread to the nearby lymph nodes. M1 represents any metastases to other body sites.

The AJCC then combines the TNM scores, Gleason grade group, and PSA blood test results to categorize cancer cases into one of four stages and their subdivisions. Cancer cases with localized tumors (T1 or T2), no spread (N0 and M0), Gleason grade group 1, and PSA less than 10 ng/mL are designated stage I. Those with localized tumors and PSA between 10 and 20 ng/mL are designated stage II – , subdivided into IIA for Gleason grade group 1, IIB for grade group 2, and IIC for grade group 3 or 4. Stage III is the designation for any of three higher risk factors: IIIA is for a PSA level about 20 ng/mL; IIIB is for T3 or T4 tumors; IIIC is for a Gleason grade group of 5. Stage IV is for cancers that have spread to lymph nodes (N1, stage IVA) or other organs (M1, stage IVB).

AJCC stage for prostate cancer
AJCC Stage	TNM scores	Gleason grade group	PSA
Stage I	T1 or T2, N0, M0	1	<10 ng/mL
Stage IIA	T1 or T2, N0, M0	1	10–20 ng/mL
Stage IIB	T1 or T2, N0, M0	2	10–20 ng/mL
Stage IIC	T1 or T2, N0, M0	3 or 4	10–20 ng/mL
Stage IIIA	T1 or T2, N0, M0	3 or 4	> 20 ng/mL
Stage IIIB	T3 or T3, N0, M0	3 or 4	10–20 ng/mL
Stage IIIC	T1 or T2, N0, M0	5	10–20 ng/mL
Stage IVA	Any T, N1	Any group	Any PSA
Stage IVB	Any T, M1	Any group	Any PSA

The United Kingdom National Institute for Health and Care Excellence recommends a five-stage system based on disease prognosis called the Cambridge Prognostic Group, with prognostic groups CPG 1 to CPG 5. CPG 1 is the same as AJCC stage I. Cases with localized tumors (T1 or T2) and either Gleason grade group 2 or higher PSA levels (10 to 20 ng/mL) are designated CPG 2. CPG 3 represents either Gleason grade group 3, or the combination of the CPG 2 criteria. CPG 4 is similar to AJCC stage 3 – any of Gleason grade group 4, PSA levels above 20 ng/mL, or a tumor that has grown beyond the prostate (T3). CPG 5 is for the highest risk cases: either a T4 tumor, Gleason grade group 5, or any two of the CPG 4 criteria.

== Prevention ==
Regulatory agencies have not approved any drug or vaccine for the prevention of prostate cancer. Several studies have shown 5α-reductase inhibitors – both finasteride and dutasteride, which are used to treat non-cancerous enlarged prostate – to reduce the total incidence of prostate cancer; however, it is unclear as of 2022 whether they reduce any cases of dangerous disease.

== Management ==
Treatment of prostate cancer varies based on how advanced the cancer is, the risk it may spread, and the affected person's health and personal preferences. Those with localized disease at low risk for spread are often more likely to be harmed by the side effects of treatment than the disease itself, and so are regularly tested for a worsening of their disease. Those at higher risk may receive treatment to eliminate the tumor – typically prostatectomy (surgery to remove the prostate) or radiation therapy, sometimes alongside hormone therapy. Those with metastatic disease are treated with chemotherapy, as well as radiation or other agents to alleviate the symptoms of metastatic tumors. Blood PSA levels are monitored every few months to assess the effectiveness of treatments and whether the disease is recurring or advancing.

=== Localized disease ===
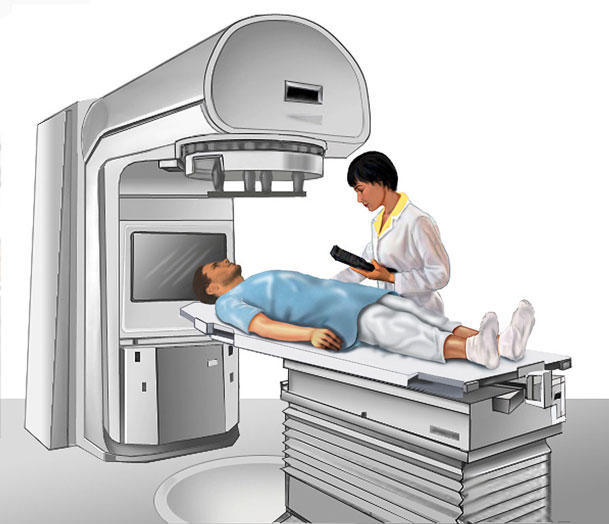
Setup for radiation therapy. The person lies flat while a radiation beam is focused on the tumor site.

Men diagnosed with low-risk cases of prostate cancer often defer treatment. They are often monitored regularly for cancer progression by active surveillance, which involves testing for tumor growth at fixed intervals by PSA tests (around every six months), digital rectal exam (annually), and MRI or repeat biopsies (every one to three years). This program continues until increases in PSA levels, Gleason grade, or tumor size indicate a higher-risk tumor that may require intervention. At least half of men remain on active surveillance, never requiring more direct treatment for their prostate tumors.

Those who elect to have therapy receive radiation therapy or a prostatectomy; these have similar rates of cancer control, but different side effects. Radiation can be delivered by intensity-modulated radiation therapy (IMRT), which allows for high doses (greater than 80 Gy) to be delivered to the prostate with relatively little radiation to other organs, or by brachytherapy, where a radioactive source is surgically inserted into the prostate. IMRT is given over several sessions, with treatments repeated five days per week for several weeks. Brachytherapy is typically performed in a single session, with the radioactive source permanently implanted into the prostate, where it expends its radioactivity within the next few months. With either technique, radiation damage to nearby organs can increase the risk of subsequent bladder cancer and cause erectile dysfunction, infertility, irreversible lumbar plexopathy and radiation proctitis – damage to the rectum that can cause diarrhea, bloody stools, fecal incontinence, and pain.

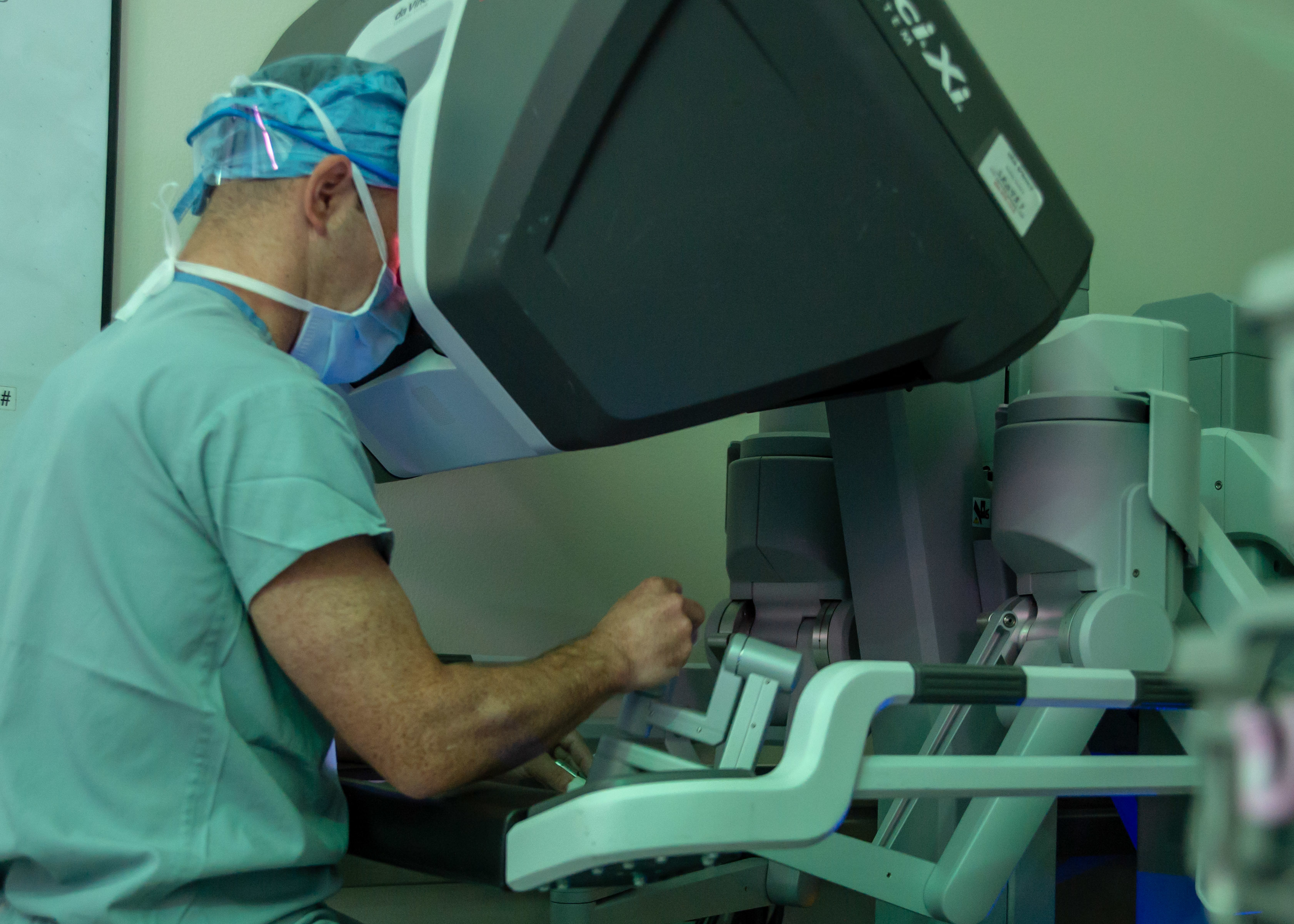
A surgeon performs robot-assisted surgery.

Radical prostatectomy aims to surgically remove the cancerous part of the prostate, along with the seminal vesicles, and the end of the vas deferens (the duct that delivers sperm from the testes). In wealthier countries, this is typically done by robot-assisted surgery, where robotic tools inserted through small holes in the abdomen allow a surgeon to make small and exact movements during surgery. This method results in shorter hospital stays, less blood loss, and fewer complications than traditional open surgery. In places where robot-assisted surgery is unavailable, prostatectomy can be performed laparoscopically (using a camera and hand tools through small holes in the abdomen), or through traditional open surgery with an incision above the penis (retropubic approach) or below the scrotum (perineal approach). The four approaches result in similar rates of cancer control. Damage to nearby tissue during surgery can result in erectile dysfunction and urinary incontinence. Erectile dysfunction is more likely in those who are older or have had previous erectile issues. Incontinence is more common in those who are older and have shorter urethras. Both for cancer progression outcomes and surgical side effects, the skill and experience of the individual surgeon doing the procedure are among the greatest determinants of success.

After prostatectomy, PSA levels drop rapidly, reaching very low or undetectable levels within two months. Radiotherapy also substantially reduces PSA levels, but more slowly and less completely, with PSA levels reaching their nadir two years after radiotherapy. After either treatment, PSA levels are monitored regularly. Up to half of those treated will eventually have a rise in PSA levels, suggesting the tumor or small metastases are growing again. People with high or rising PSA levels are often offered another round of radiation therapy directed at the former tumor site. This reduces risk for further progression by 75%. Those suspected of metastases can undergo PET scanning with sensitive radiotracers C-11 choline, F-18 fluciclovine, and F-18 or Ga-68 attached to a PSMA-targeting drug, each of which can detect small metastases more sensitively than alternative imaging methods.

=== Metastatic disease ===
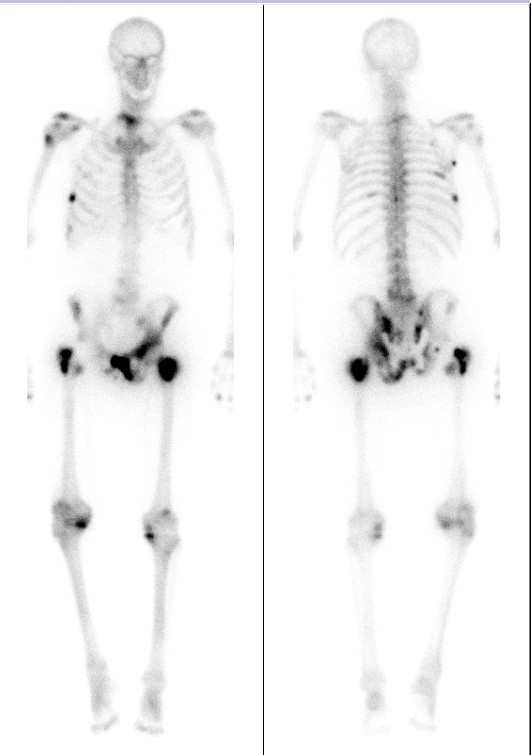
Bone scintigraphy scan of a man with metastatic prostate cancer. Dark spots indicate metastases along the pelvis, ribs, and shoulder.

For those with metastatic disease, the standard of care is androgen deprivation therapy (also called "chemical castration"), drugs that reduce levels of androgens (male sex hormones) which prostate cells require to grow. Various drugs are used to lower androgen levels by blocking the synthesis or action of testosterone, the primary androgen. The first line of treatment typically involves GnRH agonists, such as leuprolide, goserelin, or triptorelin by injection monthly or less frequently as needed. GnRH agonists cause a brief rise in testosterone levels at treatment initiation, which can worsen disease in people with significant symptoms of metastases. In these people, GnRH antagonists like degarelix or relugolix are given instead, and can also rapidly reduce testosterone levels. Reducing testosterone can cause various side effects, including hot flashes, reduction in muscle mass and bone density, reduced sex drive, fatigue, personality changes, and an increased risk of diabetes, cardiovascular disease, and depression. Hormone therapy halts tumor growth in more than 95% of those treated, and PSA levels return to normal in up to 70%.

==== Castration-resistant prostate cancer (CRPC) ====
Despite reduced testosterone levels, metastatic prostate tumors eventually continue to grow, manifested by rising blood PSA levels and metastases to nearby bones. This is the most advanced stage of the disease, called castration-resistant prostate cancer (CRPC). CRPC tumors continuously evolve resistance to treatments, necessitating several lines of therapy, each used in sequence to extend survival. The standard of care is the chemotherapy docetaxel along with antiandrogen drugs, namely the androgen receptor antagonists enzalutamide, apalutamide, and darolutamide, as well as the testosterone production inhibitor abiraterone acetate. An alternative is the cell therapy procedure Sipuleucel-T, where the affected person's immune cells are removed, treated to more effectively target prostate cancer cells, and re-injected. Tumors that evolve resistance to docetaxel may receive the second-generation taxane drug cabazitaxel.

Some CRPC treatments are used only in men whose tumors have certain characteristics that make the therapy more likely to be effective. Men whose tumors express the protein PSMA may receive the radiopharmaceutical Lu-177 PSMA, which binds to and destroys PSMA-positive cells. Those whose tumors have defective DNA damage repair benefit from treatment with the immune checkpoint inhibitor drug pembrolizumab and PARP inhibitors, namely olaparib, rucaparib, or niraparib.

=== Supportive care ===
Bone metastases – present in around 85% of those with metastatic prostate cancer – are the primary cause of symptoms and death from metastatic prostate cancer. Those with constant pain are prescribed nonsteroidal anti-inflammatory drugs. However, people with bone metastases can experience "breakthrough pain", sudden bursts of severe pain that resolve within around 15 minutes, before pain medications can take effect. Single sites of pain can be treated with external beam radiation therapy to shrink nearby tumors. More dispersed bone pain can be treated with radioactive compounds that disproportionately accumulate in bone, like radium-223 and samarium-153-EDTMP, which help reduce the size of bone tumors. Similarly, the systemic chemotherapeutics used for metastatic prostate cancer can reduce pain as they shrink tumors. Other bone-modifying agents like zoledronic acid and denosumab can reduce prostate cancer bone pain, even though they have little effect on tumor size. Metastases compress the spinal cord in up to 12% of those with metastatic prostate cancer, causing pain, weakness, numbness, and paralysis. Inflammation in the spine can be treated with high-dose steroids, as well as surgery and radiotherapy to shrink spinal tumors and relieve pressure on the spinal cord.

Those with advanced prostate cancer suffer fatigue, lethargy, and generalized weakness. This is caused in part by gastrointestinal problems, with loss of appetite, weight loss, nausea, and constipation all common. These are typically treated with appetite-increasing drugs – megestrol acetate or corticosteroids – anti-nausea medications, or treatments that emphasize underlying gastrointestinal issues. General weakness can also be caused by anemia, itself caused by a combination of the disease itself, poor nutrition, and damage to the bone marrow from cancer treatments or bone metastases. Anemia can be treated in various ways depending on the cause, or can be addressed directly with blood transfusions. Organ damage and metastases in the lymph nodes can lead to uncomfortable accumulation of fluid (called lymphedema) in the genitals or lower limbs. These swellings can be extremely painful, curtailing an affected person's ability to urinate, have sex, or walk normally. Lymphedema can be treated by applying pressure to aid drainage, surgically draining pooled fluid, and cleaning and treating nearby damaged skin.

People with prostate cancer are around twice as likely to experience anxiety or depression compared to those without cancer. When added to normal prostate cancer treatments, psychological interventions such as psychoeducation and cognitive behavioral therapy can help reduce anxiety, depression, and general distress.

As those severely ill with metastatic prostate cancer approach the end of their lives, most experience confusion and may hallucinate or have trouble recognizing loved ones. Confusion is caused by various conditions, including kidney failure, sepsis, dehydration, and as a side effect of various drugs, especially opioids. Most people sleep for long periods, and some feel drowsy when awake. Restlessness is also common, sometimes caused by physical discomfort from constipation or urinary retention, sometimes caused by anxiety. In their last few days, affected men's breathing may become shallow and slow, with long pauses between breaths. Breathing may be accompanied by a rattling noise as fluid lingers in the throat, but this is not uncomfortable for the affected person. Their hands and feet may cool to the touch, and skin become blotchy or blue due to weaker blood circulation. Many stop eating and drinking, resulting in a dry-feeling mouth, which can be aided by moistening the mouth and lips. The person becomes less and less responsive, and eventually the heart and breathing stop.

== Prognosis ==
Prostate cancer death rate in men

The prognosis of diagnosed prostate cancer varies widely based on the cancer's grade and stage at the time of diagnosis; those with lower-stage disease have vastly improved prognoses. Around 80% of prostate cancer diagnoses are in men whose cancer is still confined to the prostate. These men can survive long after diagnosis, with as many as 99% still alive 10 years from diagnosis. Men whose cancer has metastasized to a nearby part of the body (around 15% of diagnoses) have poorer prognoses, with five-year survival rates of 60–80%. Those with metastases in distant body sites (around 5% of diagnoses) have relatively poor prognoses, with five-year survival rates of 30–40%.

Those who have low blood PSA levels at diagnosis, and whose tumors have a low Gleason grade and less-advanced clinical stage, tend to have better prognoses. After prostatectomy or radiotherapy, those who have a short time between treatment and a subsequent rise in PSA levels, or quickly rising PSA levels, are more likely to die from their cancers. Castration-resistant metastatic prostate cancer is incurable, and kills a majority of those whose disease reaches this stage.

== Cause ==
Prostate cancer is caused by the accumulation of genetic mutations in the DNA of cells in the prostate. These mutations affect genes involved in cell growth, replication, cell death, and DNA damage repair. With these processes dysregulated, some cells replicate abnormally, forming a clump of cells called a tumor. As the tumor grows, its cells accumulate more mutations, allowing it to stimulate the growth of new blood vessels to support further growth.

Eventually, a tumor can grow large enough to invade nearby organs such as the seminal vesicles or bladder. In advanced tumors, cells can develop the ability to detach from their original tissue site and evade the immune system. These cells can spread through the lymphatic system to nearby lymph nodes, or through the bloodstream to the bone marrow and (more rarely) other body sites. At these new sites, the cancer cells disrupt normal body function and continue to grow. Metastases cause most of the discomfort associated with prostate cancer and can eventually kill the affected person.

== Pathophysiology ==
Most prostate tumors begin in the peripheral zone – the outermost part of the prostate. As cells begin to grow out of control, they form a small clump of dysregulated cells called a prostatic intraepithelial neoplasia (PIN). Some PINs continue to grow, forming layers of tissue that stop expressing genes common to their original tissue location – p63, cytokeratin 5, and cytokeratin 14 – and instead begin expressing genes typical of cells in the innermost lining of the pancreatic duct (cytokeratin 8 and cytokeratin 18). These multilayered PINs also often overexpress the gene AMACR, which is associated with prostate cancer progression.

Some PINs can eventually grow into tumors. This is commonly accompanied by large-scale changes to the genome, with chromosome sequences being rearranged or copied repeatedly. Some genomic alterations are particularly common in early prostate cancer, namely gene fusion between TMPRSS2 and the oncogene ERG (up to 60% of prostate tumors), mutations that disable SPOP (up to 15% of tumors), and mutations that hyperactivate FOXA1 (up to 5% of tumors).

Metastatic prostate cancer tends to have more genetic mutations than localized disease. Many of these mutations are in genes that protect from DNA damage, such as p53 (mutated in 8% of localized tumors, more than 27% of metastatic ones) and RB1 (1% of localized tumors, more than 5% of metastatic ones). Similarly, mutations in the DNA repair-related genes BRCA2 and ATM are rare in localized disease but found in at least 7% and 5% of metastatic disease cases, respectively.

The acquisition of various gene mutations accompanies the transition from castrate-sensitive to castrate-resistant prostate cancer. In castrate-resistant disease, more than 70% of tumors have mutations in the androgen receptor signaling pathway – amplifications and gain-of-function mutations in the receptor gene itself, amplification of its activators (for example, FOXA1), or inactivating mutations in its negative regulators (for example, ZBTB16 and NCOR1). These androgen receptor disruptions are found in only up to 6% of biopsies of castrate-sensitive metastatic disease. Similarly, deletions of the tumor suppressor PTEN are harbored by 12–17% of castrate-sensitive tumors, but more than 40% of castrate-resistant tumors. Less commonly, tumors have aberrant activation of the Wnt signaling pathway via disruption of members APC (9% of tumors) or CTNNB1 (4% of tumors); or dysregulation of the PI3K pathway via PI3KCA/PI3KCB mutations (6% of tumors) or AKT1 (2% of tumors).

== Epidemiology ==
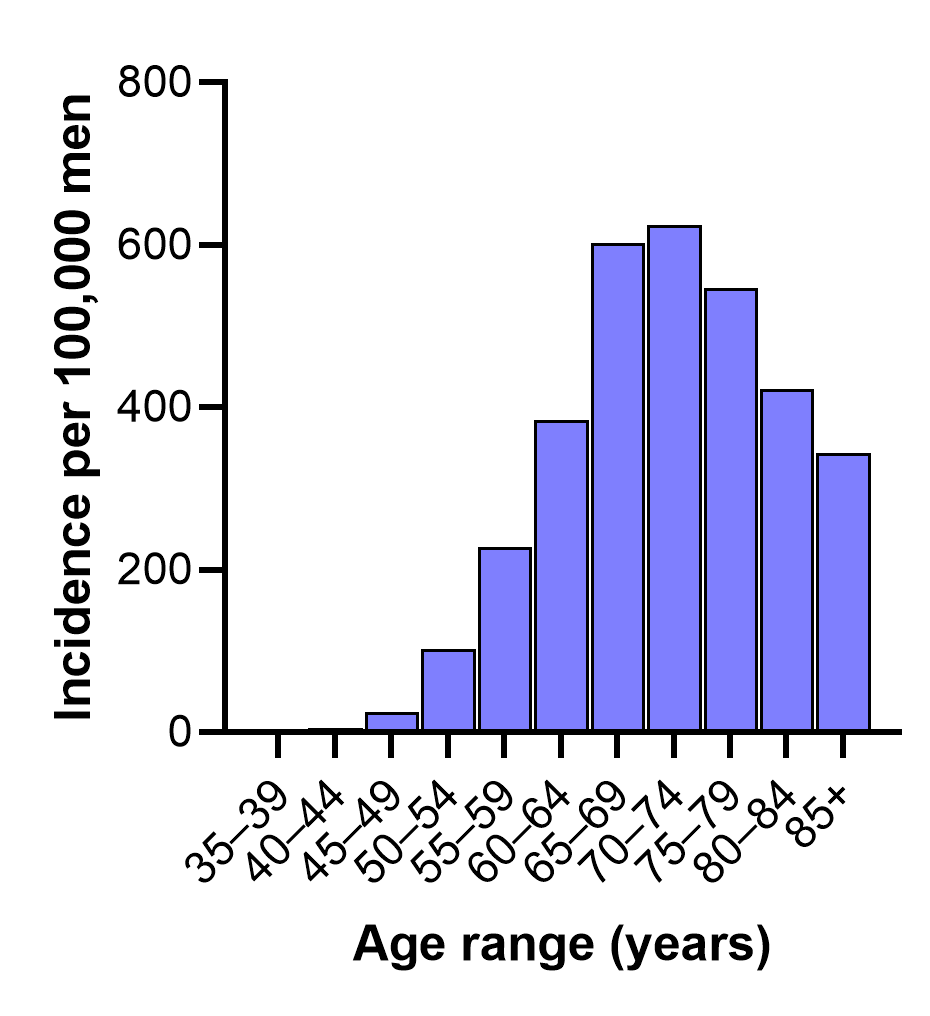
Prostate cancer incidence by age group, United States, 2016 (Note: Cancer incidence often plateaus or falls in the oldest age groups due to reduced diagnosis in people who are already in poor health.)

Prostate cancer is the second-most frequently diagnosed cancer in men, and the second-most frequent cause of cancer death in men (after lung cancer). Around 1.2 million new cases of prostate cancer are diagnosed each year. More than 350,000 people die of the disease annually. One in eight men is diagnosed with prostate cancer in their lifetime, and around one in forty die of the disease. Rates of prostate cancer rise with age. Due to this, prostate cancer rates are generally higher in parts of the world with higher life expectancy, which also tend to be areas with higher gross domestic product and higher human development index. Australia, Europe, North America, New Zealand, and parts of South America have the highest incidence. South Asia, Central Asia, and sub-Saharan Africa have the lowest incidence of prostate cancer, though incidence is increasing quickly in these regions. Prostate cancer is the most diagnosed cancer in men in more than half of the world's countries, and the leading cause of cancer death in men in around a quarter of countries.

Prostate cancer is rare in those under 40 years old,. Most cases occur in those over 60 years, with the average person diagnosed at 67. The average age of those who die from prostate cancer is 77. Only a minority of prostate cancer cases are diagnosed. Autopsies of men who died at various ages have shown cancer in the prostates of more than 40% of men over age 50. Incidence rises with age, and nearly 70% of men autopsied at age 80–89 had cancer in their prostates.

=== Genetics ===
Prostate cancer is more common in families with a history of any cancer. Men with an affected first-degree relative (father or brother) have more than twice the risk of developing prostate cancer, and those with two first-degree relatives have a five-fold greater risk compared with men with no family history. Increased risk also runs in some ethnic groups, with men of African and African-Caribbean ancestry at particularly high risk – having prostate cancer at higher rates, and having more-aggressive prostate cancers that develop at earlier ages. Large genome-wide association studies have identified more than a hundred gene variants associated with increased prostate cancer risk. The greatest risk increase is associated with variations in BRCA2 (up to an eight-fold increased risk) and HOXB13 (three-fold increased risk), both of which are involved in repairing DNA damage. Variants in other genes involved in DNA damage repair have also been associated with an increased risk of developing prostate cancer – particularly early-onset prostate cancer – including BRCA1, ATM, NBS1, MSH2, MSH6, PMS2, CHEK2, RAD51D, and PALB2. Additionally, variants in the genome near the oncogene MYC are associated with increased risk. As are single-nucleotide polymorphisms in the vitamin D receptor common in African-Americans, and in the androgen receptor, CYP3A4, and CYP17 involved in testosterone synthesis and signaling. Together, known gene variants are estimated to cause around 25% of prostate cancer cases, including 40% of early-onset prostate cancers.

In contrast to men of African descent, East Asian men have among the lowest rates of prostate cancer globally. Genomic analyses have identified distinct molecular features in East Asian prostate tumors compared to those in Western populations, including a low prevalence of ERG oncoprotein, low rates of PTEN loss, and more frequent FOXA1 alterations, suggesting that prostate cancer may arise through different pathways in these populations. Pharmacogenomic differences in testosterone metabolism between East Asian men and white American and European populations may also contribute to observed differences in disease incidence and response to androgen deprivation therapy.

=== Body and lifestyle ===
Taller men are at a slightly increased risk for developing prostate cancer, as are men who have obesity. High levels of blood cholesterol are also associated with increased prostate cancer risk; consequently, those who take the cholesterol-lowering drugs, statins, have a reduced risk of advanced prostate cancer. Chronic inflammation can cause various cancers. Potential links between infection (or other sources of inflammation) and prostate cancer have been studied. However, none have been definitively found, and one large study found no link between prostate cancer and a history of gonorrhea, syphilis, chlamydia, or infection with various human papillomaviruses.

Regular vigorous exercise may reduce one's chance of developing advanced prostate cancer, as can several dietary interventions. Those with a diet rich in cruciferous vegetables (certain leafy greens, broccoli, and cauliflower), fish, genistein (found in soy), or lycopene (found in tomatoes) are at a reduced risk of symptomatic prostate cancer. Conversely, those who consume high levels of dietary fats, polycyclic aromatic hydrocarbons (from cooking red meats), or calcium may be at an increased risk of developing advanced prostate cancer. Studies of Asian men who have migrated to Western countries show that their prostate cancer incidence rises toward that of the host country within one to two generations, suggesting that environmental and lifestyle factors, particularly diet, play a substantial role beyond genetic predisposition. Several dietary supplements have been studied and found not to impact prostate cancer risk, including selenium, vitamin C, vitamin D, and vitamin E.

=== Racial and ethnic disparities ===
Racial and ethnic differences have been observed in the incidence, diagnosis, and outcomes of prostate cancer. In the United States, African American men have higher incidence and mortality rates compared to men of European ancestry. Some studies estimate that incidence is about 1.5 times higher and mortality more than twice as high in this population.

Differences in screening have been linked to a range of social and economic factors. Limited access to healthcare, cost, and lower availability of services may affect participation in screening. Mistrust of the healthcare system has also been reported. In addition, individual beliefs and prior experiences may influence decisions about screening. Some studies have found that Black men report higher perceived risk but also more negative expectations about screening. Screening may have different levels of benefit across populations. Some analyses suggest that fewer individuals need to be screened to prevent one death among Black men compared to the general population. However, differences in mortality are thought to be related in part to differences in access to early detection.

African American men have also been reported to be diagnosed at later stages of disease. This pattern is associated with poorer outcomes. Research across multiple cancers has shown that later diagnosis can occur even when overall screening rates are similar. This has been linked to differences in follow-up care, delays in diagnostic evaluation, and variation in how screening is carried out. Delays in diagnosis and treatment may limit available options and reduce effectiveness.

Differences in treatment and healthcare access have also been reported. Social and economic conditions may affect access to care, continuity of care, and treatment options. Some studies have found differences in the use of recommended treatments and in access to specialized care centers. Other barriers including cost, time constraints, and competing responsibilities may also affect engagement with care. Mistrust related to past and ongoing experiences in healthcare settings has also been described. These factors may contribute to lower participation in clinical trials and reduced access to newer treatments. Research has shown that survival outcomes are more similar across groups when access to care, treatment, and social conditions are similar.

Overall, disparities in prostate cancer are considered to have multiple causes. These include biological, environmental, and social factors. Many studies suggest that social determinants of health, such as access to care and socioeconomic conditions, play a major role in differences in outcomes. Research in this area is ongoing.

== Special populations ==
Transgender women and gender non-conforming people who have prostates can develop prostate cancer. Those who have undergone gender-affirming hormone therapy or gender-affirming surgery have reduced risk of developing prostate cancer, relative to cisgender men of similar age. Screening tests in this group are complicated, as transgender women may have lower PSA levels than cisgender men due to their reduced testosterone levels. PSA levels greater than 1 ng/mL are generally considered above normal by gender care specialists. Digital rectal exams of the prostate are often impossible in transgender women who have undergone vaginoplasty, as the length and rigidity of the new vagina can obstruct access to the prostate from the rectum.

== History ==
A prostate mass was first described in 1817 by the English surgeon George Langstaff, following the autopsy of a man who had died at age 68 with lower-body pain and urinary symptoms. In 1853, London Hospital surgeon John Adams described another prostate tumor from a man who had died with urinary problems; Adams had a pathologist examine the tumor, providing the first confirmed case of a cancerous tumor in the prostate. The disease was initially rarely described; an 1893 report found only 50 cases described in the medical literature. Around the turn of the 19th century, prostate surgery to relieve urinary obstruction became more common, allowing surgeons and pathologists to examine the removed prostate tissue. Two studies around the time found cancer in as many as 10% of surgical specimens, suggesting prostate cancer was a fairly common cause of prostate enlargement.

For much of the 20th century, the primary therapy for prostate cancer was surgery to remove the prostate. Perineal prostatectomy was first performed in 1904 by Hugh H. Young at Johns Hopkins Hospital. Young's method became the widespread standard, initially done primarily to relieve symptoms of urinary blockage. In 1931, a new surgical method, transurethral resection of the prostate, became available, replacing perineal prostatectomy for symptomatic relief of obstruction. In 1945, Terence Millin described a retropubic prostatectomy approach, which provided easier access to pelvic lymph nodes to assist in staging the extent of disease, and was easier for surgeons to learn. This was improved upon by Patrick C. Walsh's 1983 description of a retropubic prostatectomy approach that avoided damage to the nerves near the prostate, preserving erectile function.

Radiation therapy for prostate cancer was used occasionally in the early 20th century, with radium implanted into the urethra or rectum to reduce the tumor size and associated symptoms. In the 1950s, the advent of more powerful radiation machines allowed for external beam radiotherapy to reach the prostate. By the 1960s, this was often combined with hormone therapy to improve the potency of therapy. In the 1970s, Willet Whitmore pioneered an open surgery technique where needles of Iodine-125 were placed directly into the prostate. In 1983, Henrik H. Holm improved on this by using transrectal ultrasound to guide the implantation of radioactive material.

Charles Huggins

The observation that the testicles (and the hormones they secrete) influence prostate size was made as early as the late 18th century via castration experiments in animals. However, occasional experimentation over the next century bore mixed results, likely due to the inability to separate prostate tumors from prostates enlarged due to benign prostatic hyperplasia. In 1941, Charles Huggins and Clarence V. Hodges published two studies using surgical castration or oral estrogen to reduce androgen levels and improve prostate cancer symptoms. Huggins was awarded the 1966 Nobel Prize in Physiology or Medicine for this discovery, the first systemic therapy for prostate cancer. In the 1960s, large studies showed estrogen therapy to be as effective as surgical castration at treating prostate cancer, but that those on estrogen therapy were at increased risk of suffering blood clots. Through the 1980s, Andrzej W. Schally's studies of GnRH led to the development of GnRH agonists, which were found to be as effective as estrogen without the increased risk of clotting. Schally was awarded the 1977 Nobel Prize in Physiology or Medicine for his work on GnRH and prostate cancer.

Systemic chemotherapy for prostate cancer has been studied since the 1950s, but clinical trials have failed to show benefits in most people who receive the drugs. In 1996, the US Food and Drug Administration approved the systemic chemotherapy mitoxantrone for those with castration-resistant prostate cancer based on trials showing that it improved symptoms even though it failed to enhance survival. In 2004, docetaxel was approved as the first chemotherapy to increase survival in those with castration-resistant prostate cancer. After additional trials in 2015, docetaxel use was extended to those with castration-sensitive prostate cancer.

== Society and culture ==
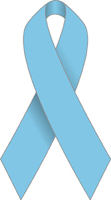
The light blue ribbon is a symbol to show support for prostate cancer awareness.

Prostate cancer screening and awareness have been widely promoted since the early 2000s by Prostate Cancer Awareness Month in September and Movember in November. However, an analysis of internet searches suggests neither event changes the level of prostate cancer interest or discussion much, in contrast to the more established Breast Cancer Awareness Month.

== Research ==
Prostate cancer is a major topic of ongoing research. From 2016 to 2020, more than $1.26 billion was invested in prostate cancer research. This represents around 5% of global cancer research funds. This places prostate cancer 10th among 18 common cancer types in funding per cancer death, and 9th in funding per disability-adjusted life year lost.

Research into prostate cancer relies on several laboratory models to test aspects of the disease. Several prostate immortalized cell lines are widely used, namely the classic lines DU145, PC-3, and LNCaP, as well as more recent cell lines 22Rv1, LAPC-4, VCaP, and MDA-PCa-2a and −2b. Research requiring more complex models of the prostate uses organoids – clusters of prostate cells that can be grown from human prostate tumors or stem cells. Modeling tumor growth and metastasis requires a model organism, typically a mouse. Researchers can either surgically implant human prostate tumors into immunocompromised mice (a technique called a patient-derived xenograft), or induce prostate tumors in mice with genetic engineering. These genetically engineered mouse models typically use a Cre recombinase system to disrupt tumor suppressors or activate oncogenes specifically in prostate cells.

As of 2024 studies exploring the relationship between ejaculation frequency and prostate cancer risk are inconclusive, and age, urinary health, and lifestyle are important factors to consider.
