= PET radiotracer =

Radioligand used for diagnostic purposes

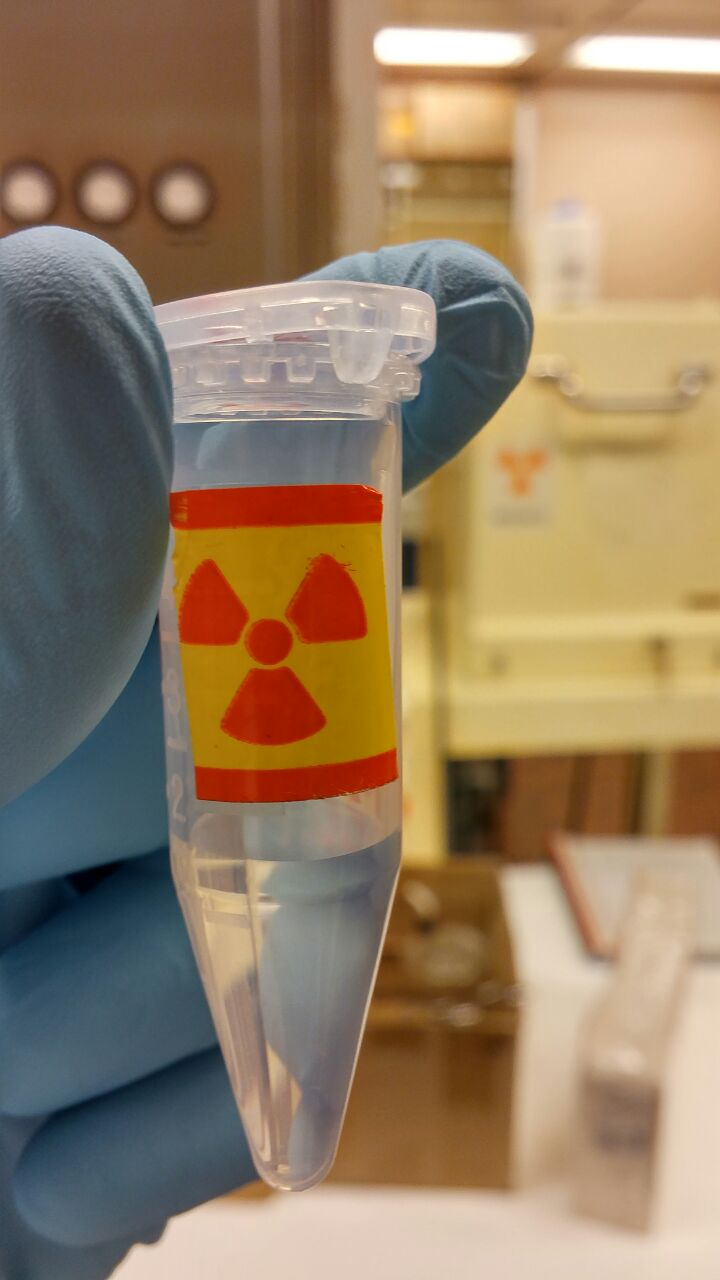
- A carbon-11 labelled radiopharmaceutical
- Synonyms: PET-ligand
- Purpose: used for diagnosis in combination with PET

PET radiotracer is a type of radioligand that is used for the diagnostic purposes via positron emission tomography imaging technique.

== Mechanism ==
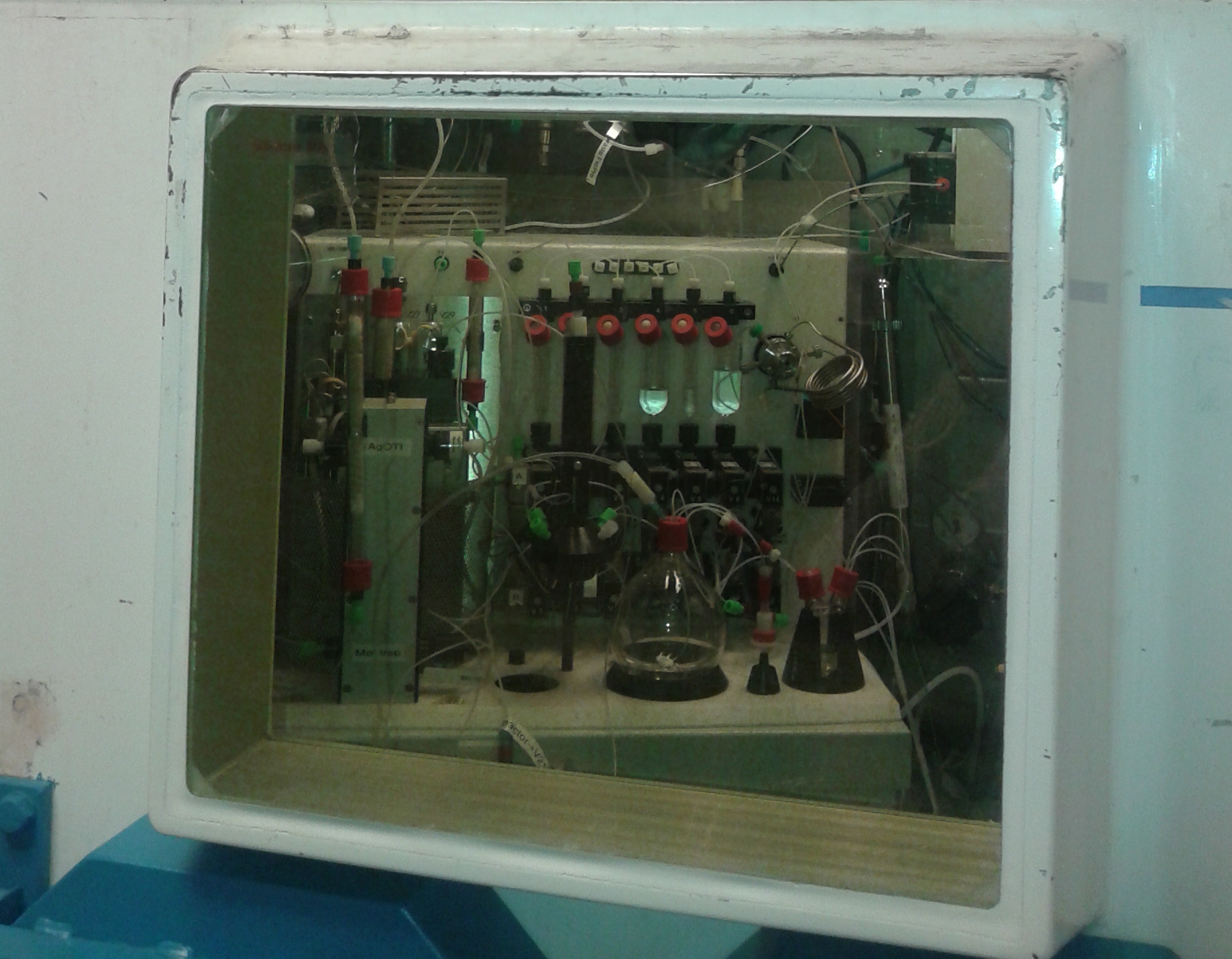
A fully automated radiosynthesis interface of PET-radiotracers

PET is a functional imaging technique that produces a three-dimensional image of functional processes in the body. The system detects pairs of gamma rays emitted indirectly by a positron-emitting radionuclide (tracer), which is introduced into the body on a biologically active molecule. Different PET radiotracers can be selected to investigate specific metabolic processes, blood flow, or molecular targets, and are used in imaging applications including cancer, neurological disorders, cardiovascular disease, and bone lesions.

== Pharmacology ==
In in vivo systems it is often used to quantify the binding of a test molecule to the binding site of radioligand. The higher the affinity of the molecule the more radioligand is displaced from the binding site and the increasing radioactive decay can be measured by scintillography. This assay is commonly used to calculate binding constant of molecules to receptors. Due to the probable injuries of PET-radiotracers, they could not be administered in the normal doses of the medications. Therefore, the binding affinity (P_{KD}) of the PET-tracers must be high. In addition, since via the PET imaging technique is desired to investigate a function accurately, the selectivity of bindings to the specific targets is very important.

== See also ==
- List of PET radiotracers
- Positron emission tomography
- Radioligand
- Radiopharmaceutical
- Radiopharmacology
