= List of drugs: Te =

This multi-page article lists pharmaceutical drugs alphabetically by name. Many drugs have more than one name and, therefore, the same drug may be listed more than once. Brand names and generic names are differentiated by capitalizing brand names.

See also the list of the top 100 bestselling branded drugs, ranked by sales.

Abbreviations are used in the list as follows:

- INN = International nonproprietary name
- BAN = British Approved Name
- USAN = United States Adopted Name
- Two-letter codes for countries

Lists of drugs
1–9 | A | B | C | D | E | F | G | H | I | J | K | L | M | N | O | P | Q | R | S | T | U | V | W | X | Y | Z

Ta–Td | Te | Tf–Th | Ti | Tj–Tq | Tra–Tri | Trj–Tz

== te ==
=== tea-tee ===
- Teargen
- Tearisol
- Téatrois
- Teatrois
- Tebamide
- tebanicline tosylate (USAN)
- tebatizole (INN)
- tebipenem pivoxil (USAN, (INN)
- Tebrazid
- tebufelone (INN)
- tebuquine (INN)
- tecadenoson (USAN)
- tecalcet (USAN)
- tecarfarin (USAN)
- Tecartus
- tecastemizole (USAN)
- teceleukin (INN)
- Tecelra
- Tecentriq
- Tecentriq Hybreza
- Technecoll
- Technegas
- Technelite
- Technescan
- technetium (99mTc) apcitide (INN)
- technetium (99mTc) bicisate (INN)
- technetium (99mTc) disofenin
- technetium (99mTc) exametazime
- Technetium (99mTc) fanolesomab (USAN)
- technetium (99mTc) furifosmin (INN)
- technetium (99mTc) glucoheptonate
- technetium (99mTc) labeled RBC
- technetium (99mTc) labeled WBC
- technetium (99mTc) macro aggregated albumin
- technetium (99mTc) mebrofenin
- technetium (99mTc) mertiatide
- technetium (99mTc) nitridocade (USAN)
- Technetium (99mTc) nofetumomab merpentan (INN)
- technetium (99mTc) pentetate
- technetium (99mTc) pertechnetate
- technetium (99mTc) pintumomab (INN)
- technetium (99mTc) sestamibi (INN)
- technetium (99mTc) siboroxime (INN)
- technetium (99mTc) sulesomab (INN)
- technetium (99mTc) sulfur colloid
- technetium (99mTc) teboroxime (INN)
- technetium (99mTc) tilmanocept (USAN)
- Technetium (99mTc) votumumab (INN)
- teclothiazide (INN)
- teclozan (INN)
- tecovirimat (USAN, (INN)
- Teczem
- tedalinab (INN)
- tedatioxetine (USAN)
- tedisamil (INN)
- tedizolid (USAN)
- Tedral
- teduglutide (USAN)
- Teebacin

=== tef-tel ===
- tefazoline (INN)
- tefenperate (INN)
- tefibazumab (USAN)
- tefinostat (INN)
- tefludazine (INN)
- teflurane (INN)
- teflutixol (INN)
- Tega-Vert
- tegafur (INN)
- tegaserod (USAN)
- Tegison
- teglarinad (USAN, INN)
- tegobuvir (USAN, INN)
- tegomil fumarate (INN)
- Tegopen
- Tegretol (Novartis)
- Tegrin
- teicoplanin (INN)
- telaprevir (USAN)
- telapristone (USAN, INN)
- telatinib (USAN)
- telavancin (USAN)
- telbermin (INN)
- telbivudine (USAN)
- telcagepant (USAN, INN)
- Teldrin (Gemini Pharmaceuticals)
- telenzepine (INN)
- Telepaque (Sterling-Winthrop)
- telimomab aritox (INN)
- telinavir (INN)
- telisotuzumab vedotin (INN)
- telisotuzumab vedotin-tllv
- telithromycin (USAN)
- telmesteine (INN)
- telmisartan (INN)
- telotristat (USAN, INN)
- teloxantrone (INN)
- teludipine (INN)

=== tem ===
- temafloxacin (INN)
- temanogrel (USAN, INN)
- Temaril
- temarotene (INN)
- tematropium metilsulfate (INN)
- Temaz
- temazepam (INN)
- temefos (INN)
- temelastine (INN)
- temiverine (INN)
- temocapril (INN)
- temocaprilat (INN)
- temocillin (INN)
- Temodar
- Temodar (Schering)
- temodox (INN)
- temoporfin (INN)
- Temovate
- temozolomide (INN)
- temsirolimus (USAN)
- temurtide (INN)

=== ten-teo ===
- Ten-K
- Tenake
- tenamfetamine (INN)
- Tenathan
- tenatumomab (USAN)
- Tencon
- tendamistat (INN)
- tenecteplase (INN)
- tenegliptin (USAN)
- teneliximab (USAN)
- Tenex
- tenidap (INN)
- tenifatecan (USAN, INN)
- tenilapine (INN)
- teniloxazine (INN)
- tenilsetam (INN)
- teniposide (INN)
- tenivastatin calcium (USAN)
- Tenkasi
- tenocyclidine (INN)
- tenofovir alafenamide (INN)
- tenofovir disoproxil (INN)
- tenonitrozole (INN)
- Tenoretic
- Tenormin
- tenosal (INN)
- tenosiprol (INN)
- tenoxicam (INN)
- Tensilon
- Tenuate
- tenylidone (INN)
- teopranitol (INN)
- teoprolol (INN)

=== tep-teq ===
- Tepanil
- Tepezza
- tepirindole (INN)
- Tepkinly
- teplizumab (USAN)
- tepoxalin (INN)
- teprenone (INN)
- teprotide (INN)
- teprotumumab (INN, USAN)
- Tepylute
- Tequin

=== ter ===
==== tera-terg ====
- terameprocol (USAN)
- Terazol
- terazosin (INN)
- terbequinil (INN)
- terbinafine (INN)
- terbogrel (INN)
- terbucromil (INN)
- terbufibrol (INN)
- terbuficin (INN)
- terbuprol (INN)
- terbutaline (INN)
- terciprazine (INN)
- terconazole (INN)
- terdecamycin (INN)
- tererstigmine (INN)
- terfenadine (INN)
- terflavoxate (INN)
- terfluranol (INN)
- Terfonyl
- terguride (INN)

==== teri-teru ====
- teriflunomide (USAN)
- terikalant (INN)
- Teril
- teriparatide (INN)
- terizidone (INN)
- terlakiren (INN)
- terlipressin (INN)
- ternidazole (INN)
- terodiline (INN)
- terofenamate (INN)
- teroxalene (INN)
- teroxirone (INN)
- Terra-Cortril
- Terramycin
- tertatolol (INN)
- tertomotide (USAN)
- terutroban (INN)

=== tes ===
- tesaglitazar (USAN)
- tesamorelin (USAN)
- teserstigmine (INN)
- tesetaxel (INN)
- tesicam (INN)
- tesimide (INN)
- Teslac
- Teslac (Bristol-Myers Squibb)
- Teslascan
- Tessalon
- Testim
- Testoderm
- testolactone (INN)
- Testomar
- Testopel
- testosterone ketolaurate (INN)
- testosterone undecanoate (USAN)
- testosterone (INN)
- Testred
- Tesuloid

=== tet ===
- tetrabarbital (INN)
- tetrabenazine (INN)
- tetracaine (INN)
- Tetracap
- Tetrachel
- tetracosactide (INN)
- tetracycline (INN)
- Tetracyn
- tetradonium bromide (INN)
- Tetralan
- Tetram
- Tetramed
- tetramethrin (INN)
- tetramisole (INN)
- Tetramune
- tetraxetan (USAN)
- tetrazepam (INN)
- tetrazolast (INN)
- Tetrex
- tetridamine (INN)
- tetriprofen (INN)
- tetrofosmin (INN)
- tetronasin (INN)
- tetroquinone (INN)
- tetroxoprim (INN)
- tetrylammonium bromide (INN)
- tetryzoline (INN)

=== tev-tez ===
- Tev-Tropin
- Tevagrastim
- teverelix (INN)
- Teveten
- Tevimbra
- Texacort
- texacromil (INN)
- tezampanel (USAN)
- Tezruly

== See also ==
- List of radiopharmaceuticals
