= Seratrodast =

Chemical used in the treatment of asthma

Clinical data
- Trade names: Bronica in Japan, Changnuo, Mai Xu Jia, Quan Kang Nuo in China and as Seradair in India. .
- AHFS/Drugs.com: International Drug Names
- Routes of administration: By mouth (tablets, granules)
- ATC code: R03DX06 (WHO)

Legal status
- Legal status: In general: ℞ (Prescription only)

Pharmacokinetic data
- Protein binding: >96%
- Elimination half-life: 22 hours

Identifiers
- IUPAC name: 7-Phenyl-7-(2,4,5-trimethyl-3,6-dioxocyclohexa-1,4-dien-1-yl)heptanoic acid
- CAS Number: 112665-43-7
- PubChem CID: 2449
- ChemSpider: 2355
- UNII: 4U58JM421N
- KEGG: D01123
- CompTox Dashboard (EPA): DTXSID4021397
- ECHA InfoCard: 100.220.176

Chemical and physical data
- Formula: C_{22}H_{26}O_{4}
- Molar mass: 354.446 g·mol^{−1}
- 3D model (JSmol): Interactive image
- SMILES: CC1=C(C(=O)C(=C(C1=O)C)C(CCCCCC(=O)O)C2=CC=CC=C2)C
- InChI: InChI=1S/C22H26O4/c1-14-15(2)22(26)20(16(3)21(14)25)18(17-10-6-4-7-11-17)12-8-5-9-13-19(23)24/h4,6-7,10-11,18H,5,8-9,12-13H2,1-3H3,(H,23,24); Key:ZBVKEHDGYSLCCC-UHFFFAOYSA-N

Seratrodast (development name, AA-2414; marketed originally as Bronica) is a thromboxane A_{2} (TXA_{2}) receptor (TP receptor) antagonist used primarily in the treatment of asthma. It was the first TP receptor antagonist that was developed as an anti-asthmatic drug and received marketing approval in Japan in 1997. As of 2017 seratrodast was marketed as Bronica in Japan, and as Changnuo, Mai Xu Jia, Quan Kang Nuo in China.

Unlike thromboxane synthase inhibitors such as ozagrel, seratrodast does not affect thrombus formation, time to occlusion and bleeding time. Seratrodast has no effect on prothrombin time and activated partial thromboplastin time, thus ruling out any action on blood coagulation cascade.

== Medical uses ==
Seratrodast is used to treat asthma.

There are no adequate and well-controlled studies of seratrodast in pregnant women. The drug should be used in pregnancy only if the potential benefits justify the risk to the fetus. Seratrodast should not be used during lactation.

The safety and efficacy of seratrodast has not been established in children (<18 years of age).

== Contraindications and interactions ==
Seratrodast should not be used in people with liver disease.

Use with paracetamol or with cephem antibiotics increases the risk of liver damage. Use with aspirin increases the bioavailability of seratrodast.

== Adverse effects ==
The most frequently observed (0.1 to 5%) adverse reactions include elevated transaminases, nausea, loss of appetite, stomach discomfort, abdominal pain, diarrhea, constipation, dry mouth, taste disturbance, drowsiness, headache, dizziness, palpitations and malaise. Less than 0.1% of patients experienced vomiting, thrombocytopenia, epistaxis, bleeding tendency, insomnia, tremor, numbness, hot flushes and edema. All the adverse reactions reported were of mild to moderate severity, and resolved when the drug was discontinued.

== Pharmacology ==
Thromboxane A2 (TXA_{2}) is generated in the lungs of people with asthma, and when it signals through the thromboxane receptor it causes bronchoconstriction, vasoconstriction, mucous secretion, and airway hyper-responsiveness. Seratrodast inhibits the activity of the thromboxane receptor, blocking the effects of TXA_{2}.

=== Pharmacokinetics ===
The pharmacokinetics of seratrodast have been studied in Japanese and Caucasian, including Indian, healthy volunteers. The plasma concentrations of seratrodast increase with increasing doses. The absorption of seratrodast is relatively rapid with maximum plasma concentrations of 4.6–6 μg/ml obtained in 3 to 4 hours. Steady state plasma concentrations of seratrodast are reached within 4–5 days. Seratrodast is slowly cleared, mainly by hepatic biotransformation. The drug shows biexponential decay in plasma profiles with a mean elimination half-life of 22 hours. Approximately 20% of the administered dose is recovered in the urine, with 60% of the urinary recovery being in the form of conjugates

== Chemistry ==
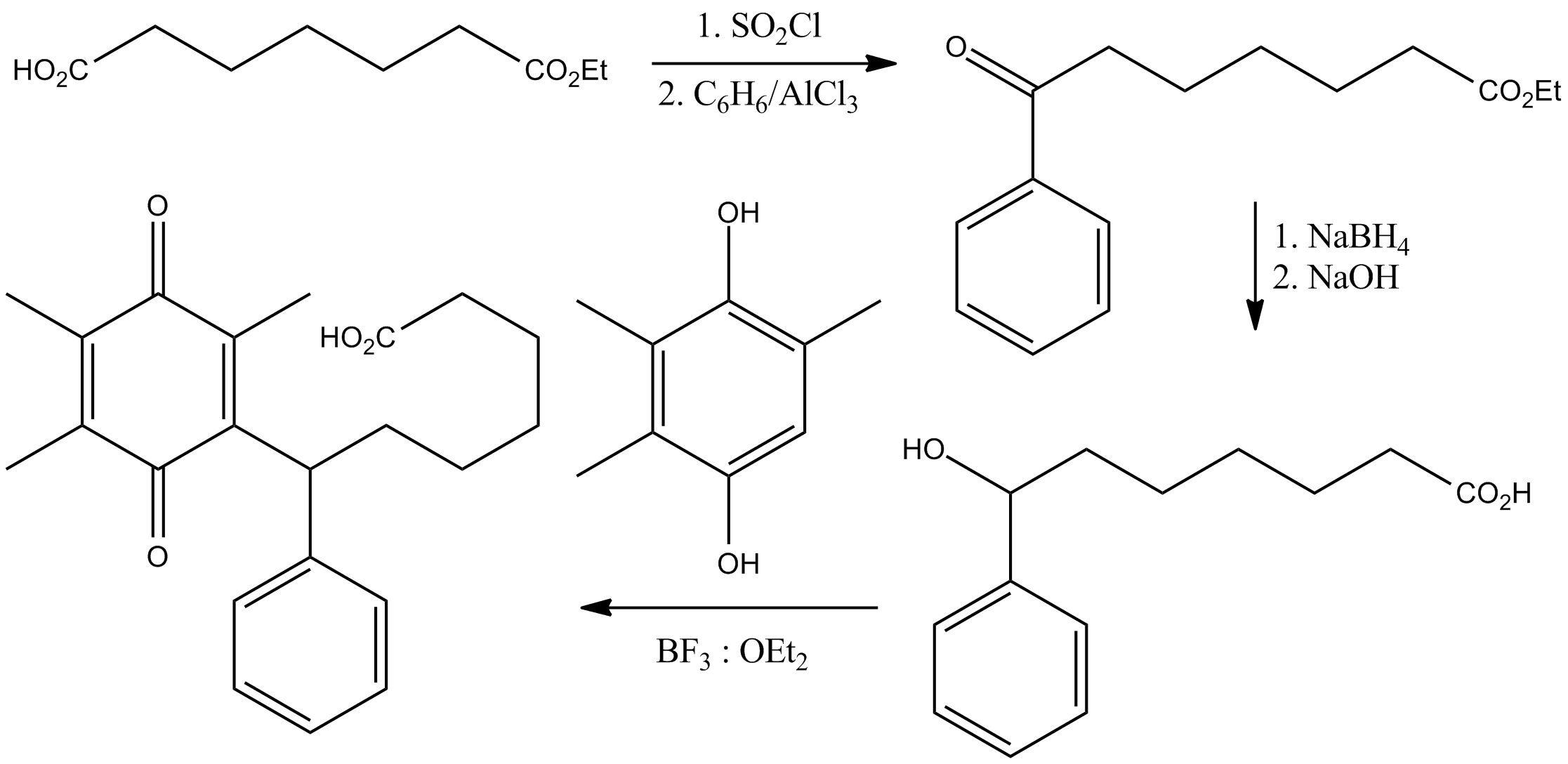

Seratrodast can be prepared in five steps starting from pimelic acid monoester.

== History ==
Seratrodast was the first thromboxane receptor antagonist to reach the market as a treatment for asthma; it was approved in Japan in 1997.

== Society and culture ==
As of 2017 seratrodast was marketed as Bronica in Japan, Changnuo, Mai Xu Jia, Quan Kang Nuo in China and as Seretra & Seradair in India.

== Research ==
Seratrodast was studied in perennial allergic rhinitis, chronic bronchitis and chronic pulmonary emphysema but efforts to bring the drug to market in those indications was abandoned around 2000.
