= C23H28 =

The molecular formula C_{23}H_{28} may refer to:

- Temarotene
- Zeinoxanthin
