= C20H32O6 =

The molecular formula C_{20}H_{32}O_{6} (molar mass: 368.464 g/mol, exact mass: 368.2199 u) may refer to:

- 11-Dehydrothromboxane B2
- Prostaglandin G2
