= C12H20N2O3 =

The molecular formula C_{12}H_{20}N_{2}O_{3} (molar mass: 240.30 g/mol, exact mass: 240.1474 u) may refer to:

- Pirbuterol
- Tetrabarbital
