= SER150 =

Pharmaceutical drug

Clinical data
- Other names: EV 077; ICI 192605 (racemic)

Identifiers
- IUPAC name: (4Z)-6-[(2R,4R,5S)-2-(2-Chlorophenyl)-4-(2-hydroxyphenyl)-1,3-dioxan-5-yl]-4-hexenoic acid
- CAS Number: 1041850-31-0 117621-64-4 (racemic)
- PubChem CID: 6604763
- UNII: N9V9W560PW

Chemical and physical data
- Formula: C_{22}H_{23}ClO_{5}
- Molar mass: 402.87 g·mol^{−1}
- 3D model (JSmol): Interactive image
- SMILES: C(/C=C\CCC(O)=O)[C@H]1[C@H](O[C@H](OC1)C2=C(Cl)C=CC=C2)C3=C(O)C=CC=C3
- InChI: InChI=1S/C22H23ClO5/c23-18-11-6-4-9-16(18)22-27-14-15(8-2-1-3-13-20(25)26)21(28-22)17-10-5-7-12-19(17)24/h1-2,4-7,9-12,15,21-22,24H,3,8,13-14H2,(H,25,26)/b2-1-/t15-,21+,22+/m1/s1; Key:WHUIENZXNGAHQI-GKZDNZBASA-N

SER150 (formerly EV 077) is an inhibitor of thromboxane synthase and an antagonist of the thromboxane prostanoid receptor. It was developed for diabetic nephropathy.
