= C40H56O =

The molecular formula C_{40}H_{56}O (molar mass: 552.85 g/mol, exact mass: 552.4331 u) may refer to:

- β-Cryptoxanthin
- Mutatochrome
- Rubixanthin, also known as natural yellow 27
- Zeinoxanthin
