= Terbogrel =

Names
- IUPAC name (5E)-6-{3-[tert-Butyl(cyano)carbamimidamido]phenyl}-6-pyridin-3-ylhex-5-enoic acid
- Other names (5E)-6-[m-(3-tert-Butyl-2-cyanoguanidino)phenyl]-6-(3-pyridyl)-5-hexenoic acid

Identifiers
CAS Number	149979-74-8
3D model (JSmol)	Interactive image
ChEMBL	ChEMBL281398
ChemSpider	4952549
KEGG	D06077
PubChem CID	6449876
UNII	5Z4KWQ5OGN
- InChI: InChI=1S/C23H27N5O2/c1-23(2,3)28-22(26-16-24)27-19-10-6-8-17(14-19)20(11-4-5-12-21(29)30)18-9-7-13-25-15-18/h6-11,13-15H,4-5,12H2,1-3H3,(H,29,30)(H2,26,27,28)/b20-11+ Key: XUTLOCQNGLJNSA-RGVLZGJSSA-N; InChI=1S/C23H27N5O2/c1-23(2,3)28-22(26-16-24)27-19-10-6-8-17(14-19)20(11-4-5-12-21(29)30)18-9-7-13-25-15-18/h6-11,13-15H,4-5,12H2,1-3H3,(H,29,30)(H2,26,27,28)/b20-11+
- SMILES: N#CN\C(=N/C(C)(C)C)Nc2cccc(C(=C/CCCC(=O)O)\c1cccnc1)c2

Properties
Chemical formula	C_{23}H_{27}N_{5}O_{2}
Molar mass	405.502 g·mol^{−1}
- Except where otherwise noted, data are given for materials in their standard state (at 25 °C [77 °F], 100 kPa). verify (what is ?) Infobox references

Terbogrel (INN) is an experimental drug that has been studied for its potential to prevent the vasoconstricting and platelet-aggregating action of thromboxanes. Terbogrel is an orally available thromboxane A_{2} receptor antagonist and a thromboxane A synthase inhibitor. The drug was developed by Boehringer Ingelheim.

A phase 2 clinical trial of terbogrel was discontinued due to its induction of leg pain.

== See also ==
- Ramatroban
