= C21H20N4O3 =

The molecular formula C_{21}H_{20}N_{4}O_{3} (molar mass: 376.41 g/mol, exact mass: 376.1535 u) may refer to:

- Entinostat (SNDX-275)
- Picotamide
