= U46619 =

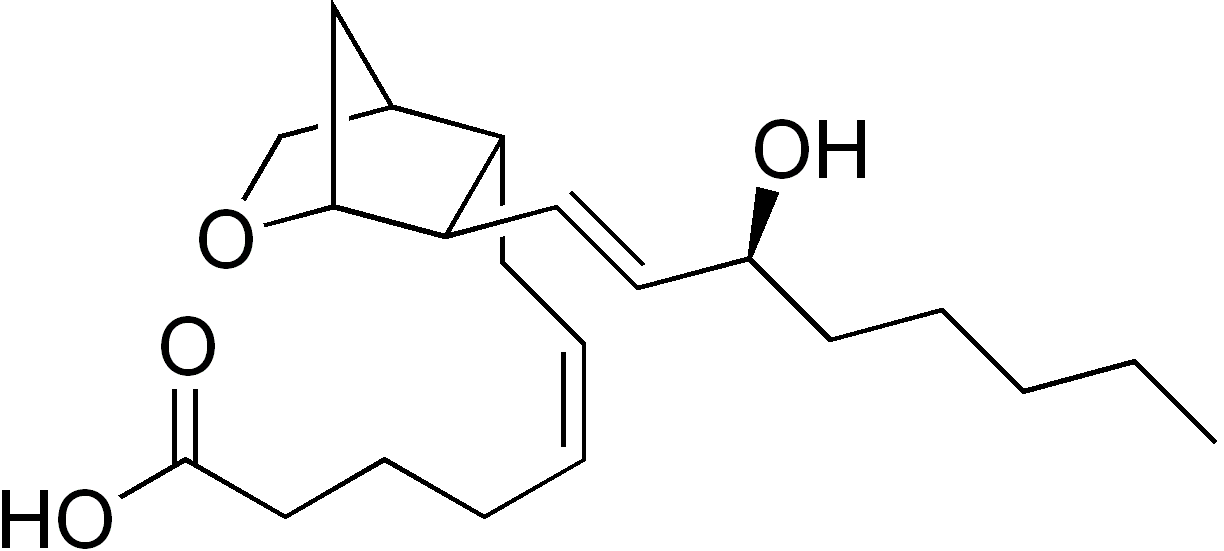

Names
- Preferred IUPAC name (5Z)-7-{(1R,4S,5S,6R)-6-[(1E,3S)-3-Hydroxyoct-1-en-1-yl]-2-oxabicyclo[2.2.1]heptan-5-yl}hept-5-enoic acid

Identifiers
CAS Number	56985-40-1
3D model (JSmol)	Interactive image
ChEBI	CHEBI:92336
ChEMBL	ChEMBL357834
ChemSpider	24719087
ECHA InfoCard	100.164.944
EC Number	637-219-1
IUPHAR/BPS	1888
PubChem CID	5311493
CompTox Dashboard (EPA)	DTXSID601028475
- InChI: InChI=1S/C21H34O4/c1-2-3-6-9-17(22)12-13-19-18(16-14-20(19)25-15-16)10-7-4-5-8-11-21(23)24/h4,7,12-13,16-20,22H,2-3,5-6,8-11,14-15H2,1H3,(H,23,24)/b7-4-,13-12+/t16-,17+,18+,19-,20-/m1/s1 Key: LQANGKSBLPMBTJ-BRSNVKEHSA-N
- SMILES: CCCCC[C@H](O)/C=C/[C@H]1[C@@H]2OC[C@@H](C2)[C@@H]1C/C=C\CCCC(O)=O

Properties
Chemical formula	C_{21}H_{34}O_{4}
Molar mass	350.49 g/mol
- Except where otherwise noted, data are given for materials in their standard state (at 25 °C [77 °F], 100 kPa). verify (what is ?) Infobox references

U46619 is a stable synthetic analog of the endoperoxide prostaglandin PGH_{2} first prepared in 1975, and acts as a thromboxane A_{2} (TP) receptor agonist. It potently stimulates TP receptor-mediated, but not other prostaglandin receptor-mediated responses in various in vitro preparations and exhibits many properties similar to thromboxane A_{2}, including shape change and aggregation of platelets and smooth muscle contraction. U46619 is a vasoconstrictor that mimics the hydroosmotic effect of vasopressin.
