= Ozagrel =

Chemical compound

Clinical data
- AHFS/Drugs.com: International Drug Names
- Routes of administration: Oral
- ATC code: none

Legal status
- Legal status: In general: ℞ (Prescription only)

Identifiers
- IUPAC name: (2E)-3-[4-(1H-imidazol-1-ylmethyl)phenyl]acrylic acid
- CAS Number: 82571-53-7
- PubChem CID: 5282440
- ChemSpider: 4445594
- UNII: L256JB984D
- KEGG: D08327
- ChEMBL: ChEMBL11662
- CompTox Dashboard (EPA): DTXSID6048547
- ECHA InfoCard: 100.122.039

Chemical and physical data
- Formula: C_{13}H_{12}N_{2}O_{2}
- Molar mass: 228.251 g·mol^{−1}
- 3D model (JSmol): Interactive image
- SMILES: C1=CC(=CC=C1CN2C=CN=C2)/C=C/C(=O)O
- InChI: InChI=1S/C13H12N2O2/c16-13(17)6-5-11-1-3-12(4-2-11)9-15-8-7-14-10-15/h1-8,10H,9H2,(H,16,17)/b6-5+; Key:SHZKQBHERIJWAO-AATRIKPKSA-N

Ozagrel (INN) is an antiplatelet agent working as a thromboxane A2 synthesis inhibitor.

== Synthesis ==

The free-radical halogenation of ethyl 4-methylcinnamate (1) with N-bromosuccinimide in the presence of benzoyl peroxide gives ethyl 4-bromomethylcinnamate (2). Alkylation of imidazole (3) with this material gives the ethyl ester (4) of the drug, which is saponified to give ozagrel.
