= Technetium (99mTc) fanolesomab =

Chemical compound

Technetium (^{99m}Tc) fanolesomab
Monoclonal antibody
- Type: Whole antibody
- Source: Mouse
- Target: CD15

Clinical data
- Trade names: NeutroSpec
- Routes of administration: Intravenous
- ATC code: none

Identifiers
- CAS Number: 225239-31-6
- ChemSpider: none
- UNII: AMF7KOE318

Technetium (^{99m}Tc) fanolesomab (trade name NeutroSpec, manufactured by Palatin Technologies) is a mouse monoclonal antibody formerly used to aid in the diagnosis of appendicitis. It is labeled with a radioisotope, technetium-99m (^{99m}Tc).

== History and use ==
NeutroSpec was approved by the U.S. Food and Drug Administration (FDA) in June 2004 for imaging of patients with symptoms of appendicitis. It consisted of an intact murine (mouse) IgM monoclonal antibody against human CD15, labeled with technetium-99m so as to be visible on a gamma camera image. Since anti-CD15 antibodies bind selectively to white blood cells such as neutrophils, it could be used to localize the site of an infection.

== Deaths and associated recall ==
The FDA received reports from Palatin of 2 deaths and 15 life-threatening adverse events in patients who had received NeutroSpec.

These events occurred within minutes of administration of NeutroSpec and included shortness of breath, low blood pressure, and cardiopulmonary arrest. Affected patients required resuscitation with intravenous fluids, blood pressure support, and oxygen. Most, but not all, of the patients who experienced these events had existing cardiac and/or pulmonary conditions that may have placed them at higher risk for these adverse events. A review of all post-marketing reports showed an additional 46 patients who experienced adverse events that were similar but less severe. All of the reactions occurred immediately after NeutroSpec was administered.

Marketing of the product was suspended in December 2005.
