= Tenatumomab =

Monoclonal antibody

Monoclonal antibody
- Type: Whole antibody
- Source: Mouse
- Target: Tenascin C

Clinical data
- ATC code: none

Identifiers
- CAS Number: 1412891-40-7
- ChemSpider: none
- UNII: 7C201CLB71

Tenatumomab is a monoclonal antibody designed for the treatment of cancer.
