= Telisotuzumab vedotin =

Antibody-drug conjugate

Monoclonal antibody
- Type: Whole antibody
- Source: Humanized
- Target: c-Met

Clinical data
- Trade names: Emrelis
- Other names: ABBV-399, telisotuzumab vedotin-tllv
- AHFS/Drugs.com: Monograph
- MedlinePlus: a625080
- License data: US DailyMed: Telisotuzumab vedotin
- Routes of administration: Intravenous infusion
- ATC code: None

Legal status
- Legal status: US: ℞-only

Identifiers
- CAS Number: 1714088-51-3
- DrugBank: DB15104
- UNII: 976X9VXC3Z
- KEGG: D11344
- ChEBI: CHEBI:756513
- ChEMBL: ChEMBL3990032

Telisotuzumab vedotin, sold under the brand name Emrelis, is an antibody drug conjugate used for the treatement of non-small cell lung cancer. Telisotuzumab vedotin is a c-Met-directed antibody and microtubule inhibitor conjugate. It was developed by AbbVie.

The most common adverse reactions include peripheral neuropathy, fatigue, decreased appetite, and peripheral edema. The most common grade 3 or 4 laboratory abnormalities include decreased lymphocytes, increased glucose, increased alanine aminotransferase, increased gamma glutamyl transferase, decreased phosphorus, decreased sodium, decreased hemoglobin, and decreased calcium.

Telisotuzumab vedotin was approved for medical use in the United States in May 2025. The US Food and Drug Administration considers it to be a first-in-class medication.

== Medical uses ==
Telisotuzumab vedotin is indicated for the treatment of adults with locally advanced or metastatic non-squamous non-small cell lung cancer with high c-Met protein overexpression who have received a prior systemic therapy.

== Adverse effects ==
The most common adverse reactions include peripheral neuropathy, fatigue, decreased appetite, and peripheral edema. The most common grade 3 or 4 laboratory abnormalities include decreased lymphocytes, increased glucose, increased alanine aminotransferase, increased gamma glutamyl transferase, decreased phosphorus, decreased sodium, decreased hemoglobin, and decreased calcium.

== History ==
Efficacy was evaluated in the LUMINOSITY study (NCT03539536), a multi-center, open label, multi-cohort trial. The trial included 84 participants with epidermal growth factor receptor wild-type, non-squamous non-small cell lung cancer with high c-Met protein overexpression who had received prior systemic therapy. The benefits and side effects of telisotuzumab vedotin were evaluated in one clinical trial of 168 participants with non-squamous, EGFR wild-type non-small cell lung cancer with high c-Met protein overexpression who had received one to three prior systemic treatments. The US Food and Drug Administration (FDA) granted accelerated approval to telisotuzumab vedotin based predominantly on evidence from one clinical trial (LUMINOSITY/NCT03539536) of 168 participants with non-squamous, epidermal growth factor receptor (EGFR) wild-type non-small cell lung cancer with c Met protein overexpression who had received prior systemic therapy, including 19 participants from the United States. The trial was conducted at 119 sites across 23 countries in North America, Europe, Asia, the Middle East, and Oceania. There were 84 participants with non-squamous, EGFR wild-type non-small cell lung cancer with high c-Met protein overexpression who had received prior systemic therapy.

The FDA granted the application for telisotuzumab vedotin priority review and breakthrough therapy designations.

== Society and culture ==
=== Legal status ===
Telisotuzumab vedotin was approved for medical use in the United States in May 2025.

=== Names ===
Telisotuzumab vedotin is the international nonproprietary name.

Telisotuzumab vedotin is sold under the brand name Emrelis.
