= 11-Dehydrothromboxane B2 =

Names
- IUPAC name (5Z,9S,13E,15S)-9,15-Dihydroxy-11-oxothromboxa-5,13-dien-1-oic acid
- Systematic IUPAC name (5Z)-7-{{#parsoidfragment:0}}{(2R,3S,4S)-4-Hydroxy-2-[(1E,3S)-3-hydroxyoct-1-en-1-yl]-6-oxooxan-3-yl}hept-5-enoic acid
- Other names 11-Dehydro-thromboxane B2

Identifiers
CAS Number	67910-12-7
3D model (JSmol)	Interactive image
ChEBI	CHEBI:28667
ChemSpider	4444414
IUPHAR/BPS	4484
KEGG	C05964
PubChem CID	5280891
UNII	CJ6ST9UG7C
- InChI: InChI=1S/C20H32O6/c1-2-3-6-9-15(21)12-13-18-16(17(22)14-20(25)26-18)10-7-4-5-8-11-19(23)24/h4,7,12-13,15-18,21-22H,2-3,5-6,8-11,14H2,1H3,(H,23,24)/b7-4-,13-12+/t15-,16-,17-,18+/m0/s1 Key: KJYIVXDPWBUJBQ-UHHGALCXSA-N; InChI=1/C20H32O6/c1-2-3-6-9-15(21)12-13-18-16(17(22)14-20(25)26-18)10-7-4-5-8-11-19(23)24/h4,7,12-13,15-18,21-22H,2-3,5-6,8-11,14H2,1H3,(H,23,24)/b7-4-,13-12+/t15-,16-,17-,18+/m0/s1 Key: KJYIVXDPWBUJBQ-UHHGALCXBE
- SMILES: O=C1O[C@H](/C=C/[C@@H](O)CCCCC)[C@H]([C@@H](O)C1)C\C=C/CCCC(=O)O

Properties
Chemical formula	C_{20}H_{32}O_{6}
Molar mass	368.46
- Except where otherwise noted, data are given for materials in their standard state (at 25 °C [77 °F], 100 kPa). verify (what is ?) Infobox references

11-Dehydrothromboxane B2 (or 11-dehydro-TXB2) is produced from the breakdown of thromboxane A2. It is released by activated platelets and urine levels of 11-dehydro-TXB2 can be used to monitor the response to aspirin therapy when used to prevent heart disease and in diseases where platelet activation is prominent.
