= Thromboxane B2 =

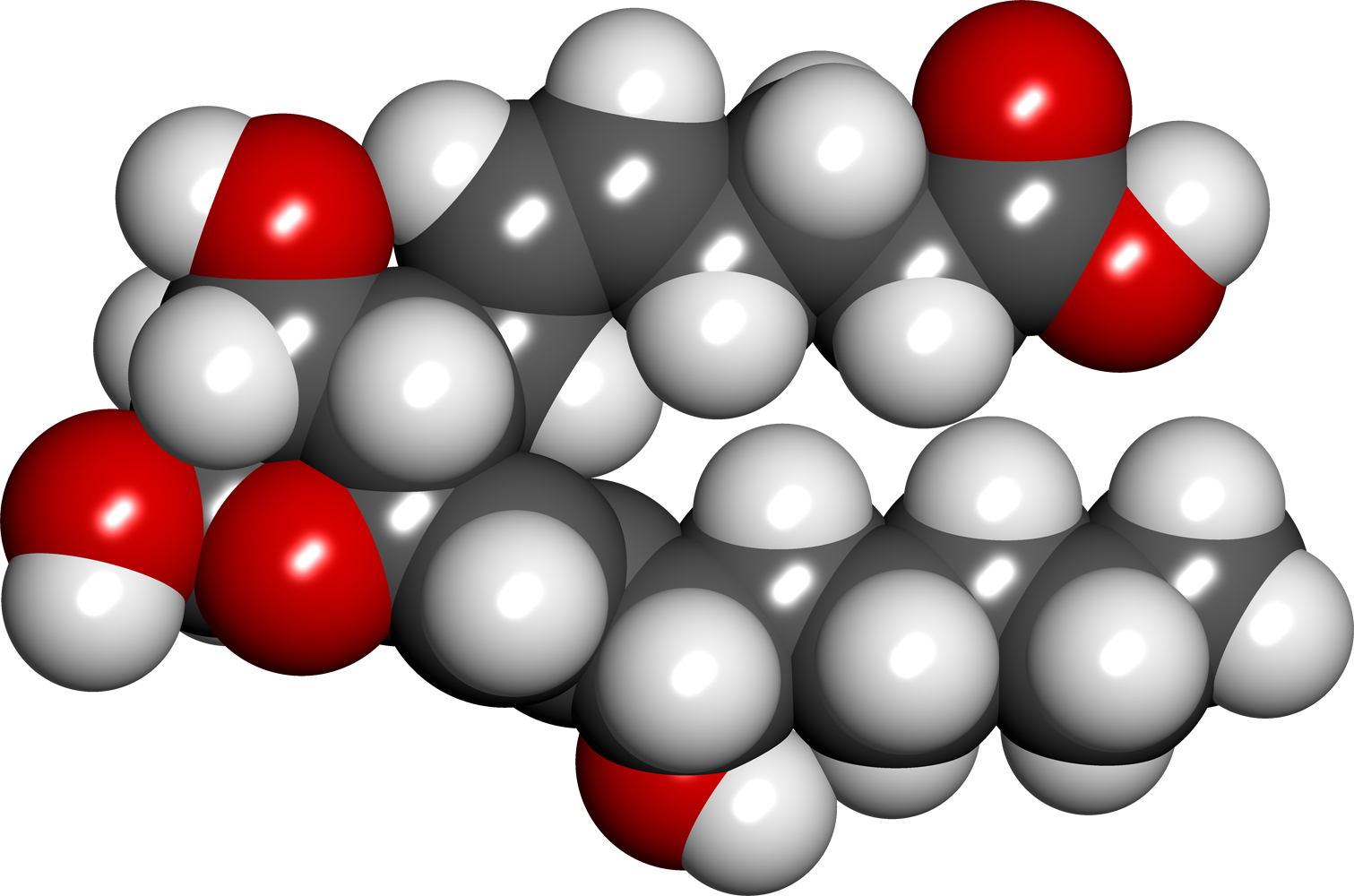

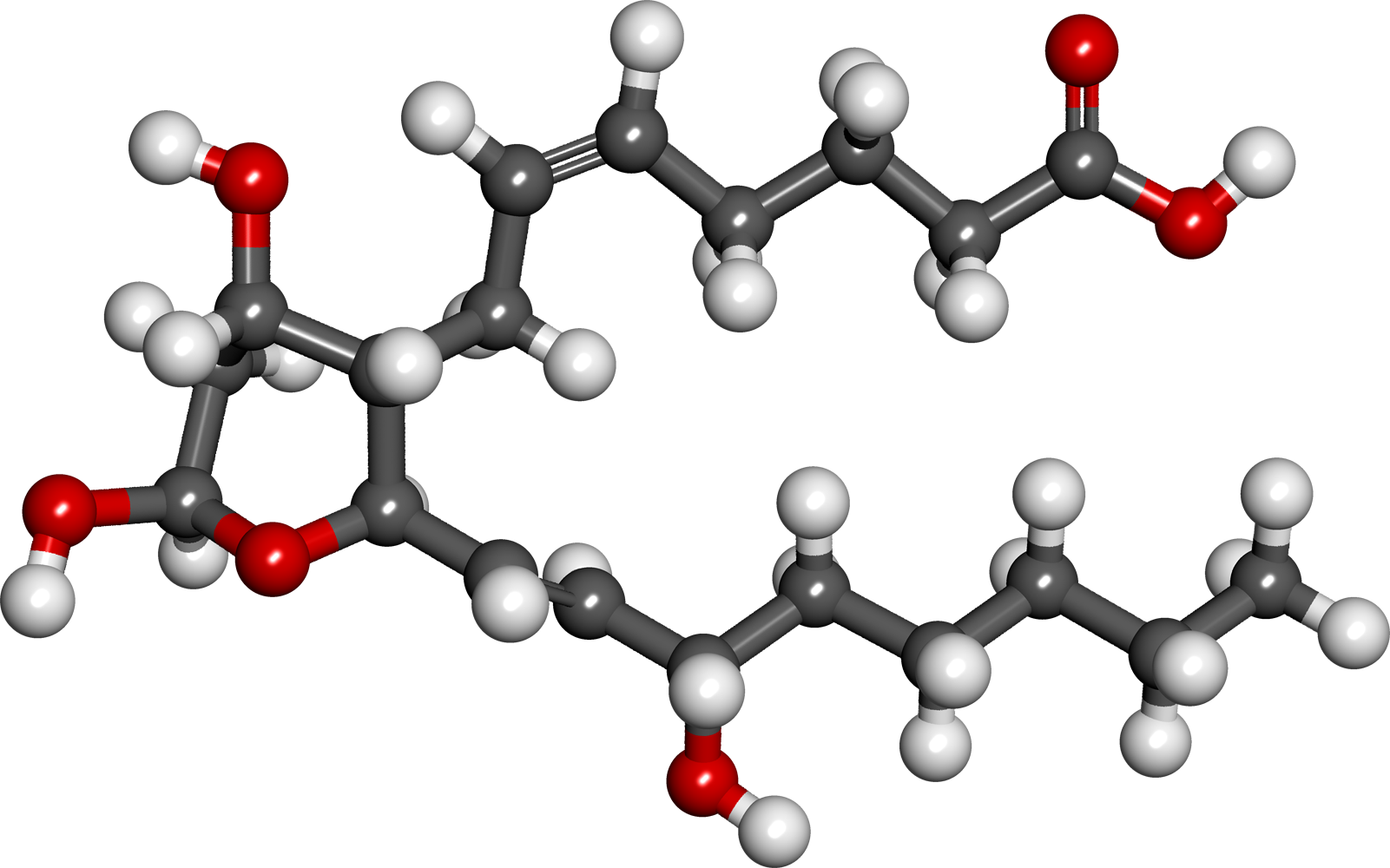

Names
- Preferred IUPAC name (5Z)-7-{(2R,3S,4S,6Ξ)-4,6-Dihydroxy-2-[(1E,3S)-3-hydroxyoct-1-en-1-yl]oxan-2-yl}hept-5-enoic acid

Identifiers
CAS Number	54397-85-2
3D model (JSmol)	Interactive image
ChEBI	CHEBI:28728
ChEMBL	ChEMBL1552426
ChemSpider	4446261
ECHA InfoCard	100.165.003
KEGG	C05963
MeSH	Thromboxane+B2
PubChem CID	5283137
UNII	V94M3R26ZV
CompTox Dashboard (EPA)	DTXSID60903947
- InChI: InChI=1S/C20H34O6/c1-2-3-6-9-15(21)12-13-18-16(17(22)14-20(25)26-18)10-7-4-5-8-11-19(23)24/h4,7,12-13,15-18,20-22,25H,2-3,5-6,8-11,14H2,1H3,(H,23,24)/b7-4-,13-12+/t15-,16-,17-,18+,20?/m0/s1 Key: XNRNNGPBEPRNAR-JQBLCGNGSA-N
- SMILES: CCCCC[C@H](O)\C=C\[C@H]1OC(O)C[C@H](O)[C@@H]1C\C=C/CCCC(O)=O

Properties
Chemical formula	C_{20}H_{34}O_{6}
Molar mass	370.48 g/mol
- Except where otherwise noted, data are given for materials in their standard state (at 25 °C [77 °F], 100 kPa). verify (what is ?) Infobox references

Thromboxane B2 (TXB2) is an inactive metabolite/product of thromboxane A2. It is almost completely cleared in the urine.

It itself is not involved in platelet activation and aggregation in case of a wound, but its precursor, thromboxane A2, is. Thromboxane A2 synthesis is the target of the drug aspirin, which inhibits the COX-1 enzyme (the source of thromboxane A2 in platelets).

2-(3,4-Di-hydroxyphenyl)-ethanol (DHPE) is a phenolic component of extra-virgin olive oil. An olive oil fraction containing DHPE can inhibit platelet aggregation and thromboxane B2 formation in vitro.
