= Technetium (99mTc) pintumomab =

Technetium (^{99m}Tc) pintumomab
Monoclonal antibody
- Type: Whole antibody
- Source: Mouse
- Target: adenocarcinoma antigen

Clinical data
- ATC code: none

Identifiers
- CAS Number: 157476-76-1
- ChemSpider: none

Technetium (^{99m}Tc) pintumomab (INN) is a mouse monoclonal antibody for the imaging of adenocarcinoma. It is labelled with the radioisotope technetium-99m.
