= Hydrocortisone/oxytetracycline =

Combination drug used for inflammatory and bacterial eye conditions

Combination of
- Hydrocortisone: Corticosteroid (anti-inflammatory)
- Oxytetracycline: Tetracycline antibiotic

Clinical data
- Trade names: Terra-Cortril

Identifiers
- CAS Number: 8017-33-2

Hydrocortisone/oxytetracycline (trade name Terra-Cortril) is a combination drug consisting of the corticosteroid hydrocortisone and the antibiotic oxytetracycline.

It is used to treat steroid-responsive inflammatory conditions where bacterial infection or a risk of bacterial infection is present, particularly in ocular applications.
