= Thromboxane receptor =

Mammalian protein found in Homo sapiens

TBXA2R

Identifiers
- Aliases: TBXA2R, BDPLT13, TXA2-R, thromboxane A2 receptor
- External IDs: OMIM: 188070; MGI: 98496; GeneCards: TBXA2R
Available structures
PDB	Ortholog search: PDBe RCSB
PDB	List of PDB id codes 1LBN

Gene location (Human)
Chr.	Chromosome 19 (human)
Band	19p13.3	Start	3,594,507 bp
Band	19p13.3	End	3,606,875 bp

Gene location (Mouse)
Chr.	Chromosome 10 (mouse)
Band	10 C1|10 39.72 cM	Start	81,164,565 bp
Band	10 C1|10 39.72 cM	End	81,171,006 bp
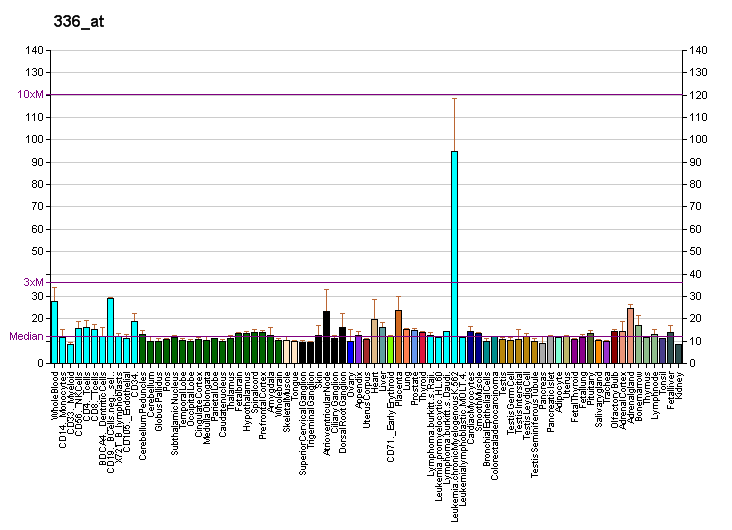

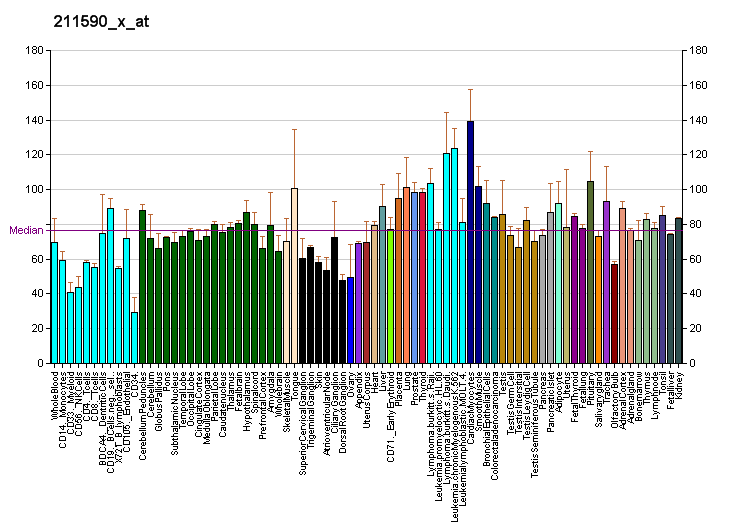

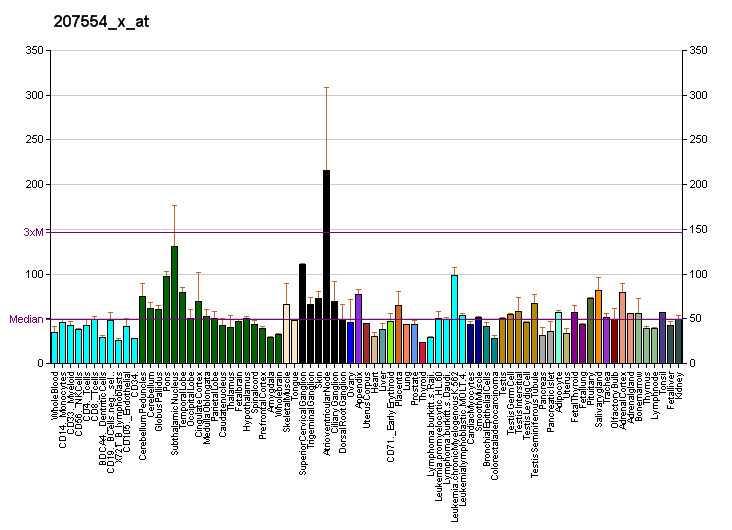
RNA expression pattern
Bgee	Human / Mouse (ortholog); Top expressed in: tendon of biceps brachii; olfactory bulb; Descending thoracic aorta; buccal mucosa cell; popliteal artery; right coronary artery; tibial arteries; ascending aorta; Skeletal muscle tissue of rectus abdominis; vena cava / Top expressed in: thymus; tunica media of zone of aorta; external carotid artery; internal carotid artery; sciatic nerve; umbilical cord; right kidney; carotid body; embryo; spleen; More reference expression data
BioGPS	More reference expression data
Gene ontology
Molecular function	G protein-coupled receptor activity; thromboxane receptor activity; guanyl-nucleotide exchange factor activity; signal transducer activity; thromboxane A2 receptor activity; protein binding
Cellular component	integral component of membrane; membrane; integral component of plasma membrane; acrosomal vesicle; plasma membrane; nuclear speck
Biological process	G protein-coupled receptor signaling pathway; response to nutrient; positive regulation of angiogenesis; signal transduction; cellular response to lipopolysaccharide; positive regulation of blood pressure; response to ethanol; thromboxane A2 signaling pathway; positive regulation of blood coagulation; positive regulation of vasoconstriction; response to testosterone; positive regulation of cytosolic calcium ion concentration; inflammatory response; regulation of vasoconstriction; second-messenger-mediated signaling; response to lipopolysaccharide; positive regulation of smooth muscle contraction; negative regulation of cell migration involved in sprouting angiogenesis; adenylate cyclase-activating G protein-coupled receptor signaling pathway
Sources:Amigo / QuickGO
Orthologs
Databases	NCBI: entry; OMA: entry
Species	Human	Mouse
Entrez	6915	21390
Ensembl	ENSG00000006638	ENSMUSG00000034881
UniProt	P21731	P30987
RefSeq (mRNA)	NM_001060; NM_201636	NM_001277265; NM_009325; NM_001358512
RefSeq (protein)	NP_001051; NP_963998	NP_001264194; NP_033351; NP_001345441
Location (UCSC)	Chr 19: 3.59 – 3.61 Mb	Chr 10: 81.16 – 81.17 Mb
PubMed search
- Wikidata
View/Edit Human	View/Edit Mouse

The thromboxane receptor (TP) also known as the prostanoid TP receptor is a protein that in humans is encoded by the TBXA2R gene, The thromboxane receptor is one among the five classes of prostanoid receptors and was the first eicosanoid receptor cloned. The TP receptor derives its name from its preferred endogenous ligand thromboxane A_{2}.

== Gene ==
The gene responsible for directing the synthesis of the thromboxane receptor, TBXA2R, is located on human chromosome 19 at position p13.3, spans 15 kilobases, and contains 5 exons. TBXA2R codes for a member of the G protein-coupled super family of seven-transmembrane receptors.

== Heterogeneity ==
Molecular biology findings have provided definitive evidence for two human TP receptor subtypes. The originally cloned TP subtype from human placenta (343 amino acids in length) is known as the α isoform and the splice variant cloned from endothelium (with 407 amino acids) is termed the β isoform. The first 328 amino acids are the same for both isoforms, but the β isoform exhibits an extended C-terminal cytoplasmic domain. Both isoforms stimulate cells in part by activating the G_{q} family of G proteins. In at least certain cell types, however, TPα also stimulates cells by activating the Gs family of G proteins while TPβ also stimulates cells by activating the Gi class of G proteins. This leads to the stimulation or inhibition, respectively, of adenylate cyclase activity and thereby very different cellular responses. Differences in their C-terminal tail sequence also allow for significant differences in the two receptors internalization and thereby desensitization (i.e. loss of G protein- and therefore cell-stimulating ability) after activation by an agonist; TP_{β} but not TP_{α} undergoes agonist-induced internalization.

The expression of α and β isoforms is not equal within or across different cell types. For example, platelets express high concentrations of the α isoform (and possess residual RNA for the β isoform), while expression of the β isoform has not been documented in these cells. The β isoform is expressed in human endothelium. Furthermore, each TP isoform can physically combine with: a) another of its isoforms to make TPα-TPα or TPβ-TPβ homodimers that promote stronger cell signaling than achieved by their monomer counterparts; b) their opposite isoform to make TPα-TPβ heterodimers that activate more cell signaling pathways than either isoform or homodimer; and c) with the prostacyclin receptor (i.e. IP receptor) to form TP-IP heterodimers that, with respect to TPα-IP heterodimers, trigger particularly intense activation of adenyl cyclase. The latter effect on adenyl cyclase may serve to suppress TPα's cell stimulating actions and thereby some of its potentially deleterious actions.

Mice and rats express only the TPα isoform. Since these rodents are used as animal models to define the functions of genes and their products, their failure to have two TP isoforms has limited understanding of the individual and different functions of each TP receptor isoform.

== Tissue distribution ==
Historically, TP receptor involvement in blood platelet function has received the greatest attention. However, it is now clear that TP receptors exhibit a wide distribution in different cell types and among different organ systems. For example, TP receptors have been localized in cardiovascular, reproductive, immune, pulmonary and neurological tissues, among others.

	Organ/Tissue	Cells/Cell lines
TP Receptor Distribution	Lung, Spleen, Uterus, Placenta, Aorta, Heart, Intestine, Liver, Eye, Thymus, Kidney, Spinal Cord, Brain	Platelets, Blood Monocytes, Glomerular mesangial cells, Oligodendrocytes, Cardiac myocytes, Afferent Sympathetic Nerve Endings in the Heart, Epithelial cells, Hela cells, Smooth muscle cells, Endothelial cells, Trophoblasts, Schwann cells, Astrocytes, Megakaryocytes, Kupffer cells, Human erythroleukemic megakaryocyte (HEL), K562 (Human chronic myelogenous leukemia) cells, Hepatoblastoma HepG2 cells, Immature thymocytes, EL-4 (mouse T cell line), astrocytoma cells

== TP receptor ligands ==
=== Activating ligands ===
Standard prostanoids have the following relative efficacies as receptor ligands in binding to and activating TP: TXA_{2}=PGH2>>PGD2=PGE2=PGF2alpha=PGI2. Since TXA_{2} is highly unstable, receptor binding and biological studies on TP are conducted with stable TXA_{2} analogs such as I-BOP and U46619. These two analogs have one-half of their maximal binding capacity and cell-stimulating potency at ~1 and 10-20 nanomolar, respectively; it is assumed that TXA_{2} and PGH2 (which also is unstable) have binding and cell-stimulating potencies within this range. PGD2, PGE2, PGF2alpha, and PGI2 have binding and stimulating potencies that are >1,000-fold weaker than I-BOP and therefore are assumed not to have appreciable ability to stimulate TP in vivo. 20-Hydroxyeicosatetraenoic acid (20-HETE) is a full agonist and certain isoprostanes, e.g. 8-iso-PGF2 alpha and 8-iso-PGE2, are partial agonists of the TP receptor. In animal models and human tissues, they act through TP to promote platelet responses and stimulate blood vessel contraction. Synthetic analogs of TXA_{2} that activate TP but are relatively resistant to spontaneous and metabolic degradation include SQ 26655, AGN192093, and EP 171, all of which have binding and activating potencies for TP similar to I-BOP.

=== Inhibiting ligands ===
Several synthetic compounds bind to, but do not activate, TP and thereby inhibit its activation by activating ligands. These receptor antagonists include I-SAP, SQ-29548, S-145, domitroban, and vapiprost, all of which have affinities for binding TP similar to that of I-BOP. Other notable TP receptor antagonists are Seratrodast (AA-2414), Terutroban (S18886), PTA_{2}, 13-APA, GR-32191, Sulotroban (BM-13177), SQ-29,548, SQ-28,668, ONO-3708, Bay U3405, EP-045, BMS-180,291, and S-145. Many of these TP receptor antagonists have been evaluated as potential therapeutic agents for asthma, thrombosis and hypertension. These evaluations indicate that TP receptor antagonists can be more effective than drugs which selectively block the production of TXA_{2} thromboxane synthase inhibitors. This seemingly paradoxical result may reflect the ability of PGH2, whose production is not blocked by the inhibitors, to substitute for TXA_{2} in activating TP. Novel TP receptor antagonists that also have activity in reducing TXA_{2} production by inhibiting cyclooxygenases have been discovered and are in development for testing in animal models.

== Mechanism of cell stimulation ==
TP is classified as a contractile type of prostanoid receptor based on its ability to contract diverse types of smooth muscle-containing tissues such as those of the lung, intestines, and uterus. TP contracts smooth muscle and stimulates various response in a wide range of other cell types by coupling with and mobilizing one or more families of the G protein class of receptor-regulated cell signaling molecules. When bound to TXA_{2}, PGH_{2}, or other of its agonists, TP mobilizes members of the:

- a) Gq alpha subunit family (i.e. G11, G15, and G16 types of Gq proteins) which activates phospholipase C, IP3, cell Ca^{2+} mobilization, protein kinase Cs, calmodulin-modulated myosin light chain kinase, Mitogen-activated protein kinases, and Calcineurin;
- b) G12/G13 family which activates Rho GTPases that control cell migration and intracellular organelle movements;
- c) Gs alpha subunit family which stimulates adenyl cyclase to raise intracellular levels of cAMP and thereby activate cAMP-regulated protein kinases A and thereby protein kinases A-dependent cell signaling pathways (see PKA)
- d) atypical G protein complex Gh/transglutaminase-2-calreticulin which activates phospholipase C, IP3, cell Ca^{2+} mobilization, protein kinase C, and Mitogen-activated protein kinase but inhibits adenyl cyclase.

Following its activation of these pathways, the TP receptors's cell-stimulating ability rapidly reverses by a process termed homologous desensitization, i.e. TP is no longer able to mobilize its G protein targets or further stimulate cell function. Subsequently, the β but not α isoform of TP undergoes receptor internalization. These receptor down regulating events are triggered by the G protein-coupled receptor kinases mobilized during TP receptor activation. TP receptor-independent agents that stimulate cells to activate protein kinases C or protein kinases A can also down-regulate TP in a process termed heterologous desensitization. For example, prostacyclin I2 (PGI2)-induced activation of its prostacyclin receptor (IP) and prostaglandin D2-induced activation of its prostaglandin DP1 receptor cause TP receptor desensitization by activating protein kinases A while prostaglandin F2alpha-induced activation of its prostaglandin F receptor and prostaglandin E2-induced activation of its prostaglandin EP1 receptor receptor desensitizes TP by activating protein kinases C. These desensitization responses serve to limit the action of receptor agonists as well as the overall extent of cell excitation.

In addition to its ability to down-regulate TPα, the IP receptor activates cell signaling pathways that counteract those activated by TP. Furthermore, the IP receptor can physically unite with the TPα receptor to form an IP-TPα heterodimer complex which, when bound by TXA_{2}, activates predominantly IP-coupled cell signal pathways. The nature and extent of many cellular responses to TP receptor activation are thereby modulated by the IP receptor and this modulation may serve to limit the potentially deleterious effects of TP receptor activation (see following section on Functions).

== Functions ==
Studies using animals genetically engineered to lack the TP receptor and examining the actions of this receptor's agonists and antagonists in animals and on animal and human tissues indicate that TP has various functions in animals and that these functions also occur, or serve as a paradigm for further study, in humans.

=== Platelets ===
Human and animal platelets stimulated by various agents such as thrombin produce TXA_{2}. Inhibition of this production greatly reduces the platelets final adhesion aggregation and degranulation (i.e. secretion of its granule contents) responses to the original stimulus. In addition, the platelets of mice lacking TP receptors have similarly defective adhesion, aggregation, and degranulation responses and these TP deficient mice cannot form stable blood clots and in consequence exhibit bleeding tendencies. TP, as studies show, is part of a positive feedback loop that functions to promote platelet adhesion, aggregation, degranulation, and platelet-induced blood clotting-responses in vitro and in vivo. The platelet-directed functions of TP are in many respects opposite to those of the IP receptor. This further indicates (see previous section) that the balance between the TXA_{2}-TP and PGI_{2}-IP axes contribute to regulating platelet function, blood clotting, and bleeding.

=== Cardiovascular system ===
Animal model studies indicate that TP receptor activation contracts vascular smooth muscle cells and acts on cardiac tissues to increase heart rate, trigger Cardiac arrhythmias, and produce myocardial ischemia. These effects may underlie, at least in part, the protective effects of TP gene knockout in mice. TP(-/-) mice are: a) resistant to the cardiogenic shock caused by infusion of the TP agonist, U46619, or the prostaglandin and thromboxane A_{2} precursor, arachidonic acid; b) partially protected from the cardiac damage caused by hypertension in IP-receptor deficient mice feed a high salt diet; c) prevented from developing angiotensin II-induced and N-Nitroarginine methyl ester-induced hypertension along with associated cardiac hypertrophy; d) resistant to the vascular damage caused by balloon catheter-induced injury of the external carotid artery; e) less likely to develop severe hepatic microcirculation dysfunction caused by TNFα as well as kidney damage caused by TNFα or bacteria-derived endotoxin; and f) slow in developing vascular atherosclerosis in ApoE gene knockout mice. In addition, TP receptor antagonists lessen myocardial infarct size in various animal models of this disease and block the cardiac dysfunction caused by extensive tissue ischemia in animal models of remote ischemic preconditioning. TP thereby has wide-ranging functions that tend to be detrimental to the cardiovascular network in animals and, most likely, humans. However, TP functions are not uniformly injurious to the cardiovascular system: TP receptor-depleted mice show an increase in cardiac damage as well as mortality due to trypanosoma cruzi infection. The mechanisms behind this putative protective effect and its applicability to humans is not yet known.

20-Hydroxyeicosatetraenoic acid (20-HETE), a product of arachidonic acid formed by Cytochrome P450 omega hydroxylases, and certain isoprostanes, which form by non-enzymatic free radical attack on arachidonic acid, constrict rodent and human artery preparations by directly activating TP. While significantly less potent than thromboxane A2 in activating this receptor, studies on rat and human cerebral artery preparations indicate that increased blood flow through these arteries triggers production of 20-HETE which in turn binds TP receptors to constrict these vessels and thereby reduce their blood blow. Acting in the latter capacity, 20-HETE, it is proposed, functions as a TXA_{2} analog to regulate blood flow to the brain and possibly other organs. Isoprostanes form in tissues undergoing acute or chronic oxidative stress such as occurs at sites of inflammation and the arteries of diabetic patients. High levels of isoprostanes form in ischemic or otherwise injured blood vessels and acting through TP, can stimulate arterial inflammation and smooth muscle proliferation; this isoprostane-TP axis is proposed to contribute to the development of atherosclerosis and thereby heart attacks and strokes in humans.

=== Lung allergic reactivity ===
TP receptor activation contracts bronchial smooth muscle preparations obtained from animal models as well as humans and contracts airways in animal models. In a mouse model of asthma (i.e. hypersensitivity to ovalabumin), a TP receptor antagonist decreased the number of eosinophils infiltrating lung as judged by their content in Bronchoalveolar lavage fluid and in a mouse model of dust mite-induced astha, deletion of TBXA2R prevented the development of airways contraction and pulmonary eosinophilia responses to allergen. Another TP receptor agonists likewise reduced airway bronchial reactivity to allergen as well as symptoms in volunteers with asthma. The TP receptor appears to play and essential role in the pro-asthmatic actions of leukotriene C4 (LTC4): in ovalbumin-sensitized mice, leukotriene C4 increased the number of eosinophils in bronchoalveolar lavage fluid and simultaneously decreased the percentages of eosinophils in blood but these responses did not occur in TBXA2R-deficient mice. LTC4 also stimulated lung expression of the pro-inflammatory intracellular adhesion molecules, ICAM-1 and VCAM-1 by a TP receptor-dependent mechanism. These findings suggest that TP contributes to asthma in animal models at least in part by mediating the actions of LTC4. Further studies are required to determine if TP receptor antagonists might be useful for treating asthma and other airway constriction syndromes such as chronic obstructive lung diseases in humans.

=== Uterus ===
Along with PGF2α acting through its FP receptor, TXA_{2} acting through TP contracts uterine smooth muscle preparations from rodents and humans. Since the human uterus loses its sensitivity to PGP2α but not to TXA_{2} during the early stages of labor in vaginal childbirth, TP agonists, it is suggested, might be useful for treating preterm labor failures.

=== Immune system ===
Activation of TP receptors stimulates vascular endothelial cell pro-inflammatory responses such as increased expression of cell surface adhesion proteins (i.e. ICAM-1, VCAM-1, and E-selectin); stimulates apoptosis (i.e. cell death) of CD4+ and CD8+ lymphocytes; causes the chemokinesis (i.e. cell movement) of native T cells; and impairs the adhesion of dendritic cells to T cells thereby inhibiting dendritic cell-dependent proliferation of T cells. TP deficient mice exhibit an enhanced contact hypersensitivity response to DNFB thymocytes in the thymus of these deficient mice are resistant to lipopolysaccharide-induced apoptosis. TP receptor-depleted mice also gradually develop with age extensive lymphadenopathy and, associated with this, increased immune responses to foreign antigens. These studies indicate that TXA2-TP signaling functions as a negative regulator of DC-T cell interactions and possibly thereby the acquisition of acquired immunity in mice. Further studies are needed to translate these mouse studies to humans.

=== Cancer ===
Increased expression of cyclooxygenases and their potential involvement in the progression of various human cancers have been described. Some studies suggest that the TXA_{2} downstream metabolite of these cyclooxygenases along with its TP receptor contribute to mediating this progression. TP activation stimulates tumor cell proliferation, migration, neovascularization, invasiveness, and metastasis in animal models, animal and human cell models, and/or human tissue samples in cancers of the prostate, breast, lung, colon, brain, and bladder. These findings, while suggestive, need translational studies to determine their relevancy to the cited human cancers.

== Clinical significance ==
Isolated cases of humans with mild to moderate bleeding tendencies have been found to have mutations in TP that are associated with defects in this receptors binding of TXA_{2} analogs, activating cell signal pathways, and/or platelet functional responses not only to TP agonists but also to agents that stimulate platelets by TP-independent mechanisms (see Genomics section below).

=== Drugs in use targeting TP ===
TP receptor antagonist seratrodast is marketed in Japan and China for the treatment of asthma. Picotamide, a dual inhibitor of TP and TXA_{2} synthesis, is licensed in Italy for the treatment of clinical arterial thrombosis and peripheral artery disease. These drugs are not yet licensed for use in other countries.

=== Clinical trials ===
While functional roles for TP receptor signaling in diverse homeostatic and pathological processes have been demonstrated in animal models, in humans these roles have been demonstrated mainly with respect to platelet function, blood clotting, and hemostasis. TP has also been proposed to be involved in human: blood pressure and organ blood flow regulation; essential and pregnancy-induced hypertension; vascular complications due to sickle cell anemia; other cardiovascular diseases including heart attack, stroke, and peripheral artery diseases; uterine contraction in childbirth; and modulation of innate and adaptive immune responses including those contributing to various allergic and inflammatory diseases of the intestine, lung, and kidney. However, many of the animal model and tissue studies supporting these suggested functions have yet to be proven directly applicable to human diseases. Studies to supply these proofs rest primarily on determining if TP receptor antagonists are clinically useful. However, these studies face issues that drugs which indirectly target TP (e.g. Nonsteroidal anti-inflammatory drugs that block TXA_{2} production) or which circumvent TP (e.g. P2Y12 antagonists that inhibit platelet activation and corticosteroids and cysteinyl leukotriene receptor 1 antagonists that suppress allergic and/or inflammatory reactions) are effective treatments for many putatively TP-dependent diseases. These drugs are likely to be cheaper and may prove to have more severe side effects that TP-targeting drugs. These considerations may help to explain why relatively few studies have examined the clinical usefulness of TP-targeting drugs. The following translation studies on TP antagonists have been conducted or are underway:

- In a non-randomized, uncontrolled examination, 4 weeks of treatment with TP receptor antagonist AA-2414 significantly reduced bronchial reactivity in asthmatic patients. A follow-up double-blind placebo controlled study of asthmatic patients found that TP receptor antagonist Seratrodast significantly reduced airway flow (i.e. FEV1), diurnal variation in FEV1, airway responsiveness to contractive stimulation, airway inflammation, and airway content of pro-allergic mediators (i.e. RANTES, CCL3, CCL7, and eotaxin).
- A phase 3 study, TP antagonist Terutroban was tested against aspirin as a preventative of recurrent as well as new ischemia events in patients with recent strokes or transient ischemic attacks. The study did not meet its primary end points compared to aspirin-treated controls and was stopped; patients on the drug experienced significant increases in minor bleeding episodes.
- A study comparing the safety and efficacy of TP antagonist ridogrel to aspirin as adjunctive therapy in the emergent treatment of heart attack with the clot dissolving agent streptokinase found that ridogrel gave no significant enhancement of clot resolution but was associated with a lower incidence of recurrent heart attack, recurrent angina, and new strokes without causing excess bleeding **complications.
- TP antagonist Ifetroban is in phase 2 clinical development for the treatment of kidney failure.

In addition to the above TP antagonists, drugs that have dual inhibitory actions in that they block not only TP but also block the enzyme responsible for making TXA2_{2}, Thromboxane-A synthase, are in clinical development. These dual inhibitor studies include:

- A long-term study in diabetic patients compared dual inhibitor picotamide to aspirin for improving ischemia symptoms caused be peripheral artery diseases found not difference in primary end points but also found that picotamide therapy significantly reduced cardiovascular mortality over a 2-year trial.
- A phase 2 clinical trial of Dual inhibitor Terbogrel to treat vasoconstriction was discontinued due to its induction of leg pain.
- Dual inhibitor EV-077 is in clinical phase II development.

=== Genomics ===
Several isolated and/or inherited cases of patients suffering a mild to moderately severe bleeding diathesis have been found to be associated with mutations in the TBXA2R gene that lead to abnormalities in the expression, subcellular location, or function of its TP product. These cases include:

- A missense mutation causing tryptophan (Trp) to be replaced by cysteine (Cys) as its 29th amino acid (i.e. Trp29Cys) yields a TP which is less responsive to stimulation by a TP agonist, less able to activate its Gq G protein target, and poorly expressed at the cell's surface. Some or perhaps all of these faults may reflect the failure of this mutated TP to form TP-TP dimers.
- An Asn42Ser mutation yields a TP that remains in the cell's Golgi apparatus and fails to be expressed at the cell surface.
- An Asp304Asn mutation yields a TP that exhibits decreased binding and responsiveness to a TP agonist.
- An Arg60Leu mutation yields a TP that is normally expressed and normally binds a TP agonist but fails to activate its Gq G protein target.
- A missense mutation that replaces thymine (T) with guanine (G) as the 175 nucleotide (c.175C>T) in the TBXA2R gene as well as Cc87G>C and c.125A>G mutations yield TP's that are poorly expressed.
- A c.190G>A mutation yields a TP that binds a TP agonist poorly.
- A guanine (G) duplication at the 167th nucleotide causes a Frameshift mutation (c.165dupG) at amino acid #58 to yield a poorly expressed TP mutant.

Single nucleotide polymorphism (SNP) variations in the TBXA2R gene have been associated with allergic and cardiovascular diseases; these include:

- Meta-analysis of several studies done on different population test groups has confirmed an association of TBXA2R single nucleotide polymorphism (SNP) variant 924C>T with an increased risk of developing asthma. The frequency of SNP 795T>C variant in TBXA2R was found in separate studies of South Korean and Japanese test groups and the frequency of the SNP variant -6484C>T preceding the TBXA2R gene in a study of a South Korean test group was found to be elevated in patients suffering a type of severe asthma termed Aspirin-induced asthma. Both 795T>C and 924C>T SNP variants encode a TP receptor that exhibits increased binding and responsiveness to TXA_{2} analogs. SNP variant -4684T was associated with reduced gene promoter activity in the TBXA2R gene and an increased incidence of developing aspirin-induced urticarial in a Korean test group.
- SNP variant rs768963 in TBX2R was associated with increased frequency of large artery atherosclerosis, small artery occlusion, and stroke in two separate studies of Chinese test groups. In one of the latter groups, the T-T-G-T haplotype of C795T-T924C-G1686A-rs768963 was significantly less frequent in patients suffering stroke. SNP variant rs13306046 exhibited a reduction in microRNA-induced repression of TBXA2R gene expression and was associated with decreased blood pressure in a Scandinavian Caucasian test group.

== See also ==
- Eicosanoid receptor
