= Teneliximab =

Monoclonal antibody

Monoclonal antibody
- Type: Whole antibody
- Source: Chimeric (mouse/human)
- Target: CD40

Clinical data
- ATC code: none

Identifiers
- CAS Number: 299423-37-3
- ChemSpider: none
- UNII: G0MV33WQ6V
- KEGG: D06071

Teneliximab is a chimeric monoclonal antibody binding to the immune stimulatory protein CD40. As of 2009, it has not entered clinical trials.
