= Ifetroban =

Chemical compound

Clinical data
- ATC code: None

Legal status
- Legal status: Investigational

Identifiers
- IUPAC name: 3-[2-({(1S,2R,3S)-3-[4-(Pentylcarbamoyl)-1,3-oxazol-2-yl]-7-oxabicyclo[2.2.1]hept-2-yl}methyl)phenyl]propanoic acid
- CAS Number: 143443-90-7
- PubChem CID: 23724921
- DrugBank: DB12321
- ChemSpider: 58452
- UNII: E833KT807K
- KEGG: D04500
- ChEMBL: ChEMBL2146062
- CompTox Dashboard (EPA): DTXSID40869931

Chemical and physical data
- Formula: C_{25}H_{32}N_{2}O_{5}
- Molar mass: 440.540 g·mol^{−1}
- 3D model (JSmol): Interactive image
- SMILES: O=C(NCCCCC)c1nc(oc1)[C@@H]4C2O[C@@H](CC2)[C@@H]4Cc3ccccc3CCC(=O)O

Ifetroban is a potent and selective thromboxane receptor antagonist. It has been studied in animal models for the treatment of cancer metastasis, myocardial ischemia, hypertension, stroke, thrombosis, cardiomyopathy, and for its effects on platelets. Clinical trials are evaluating the therapeutic safety and efficacy of oral ifetroban capsules for the treatment of cancer metastasis, cardiovascular disease, aspirin exacerbated respiratory disease, systemic sclerosis, and Duchenne muscular dystrophy.

== Synthesis ==
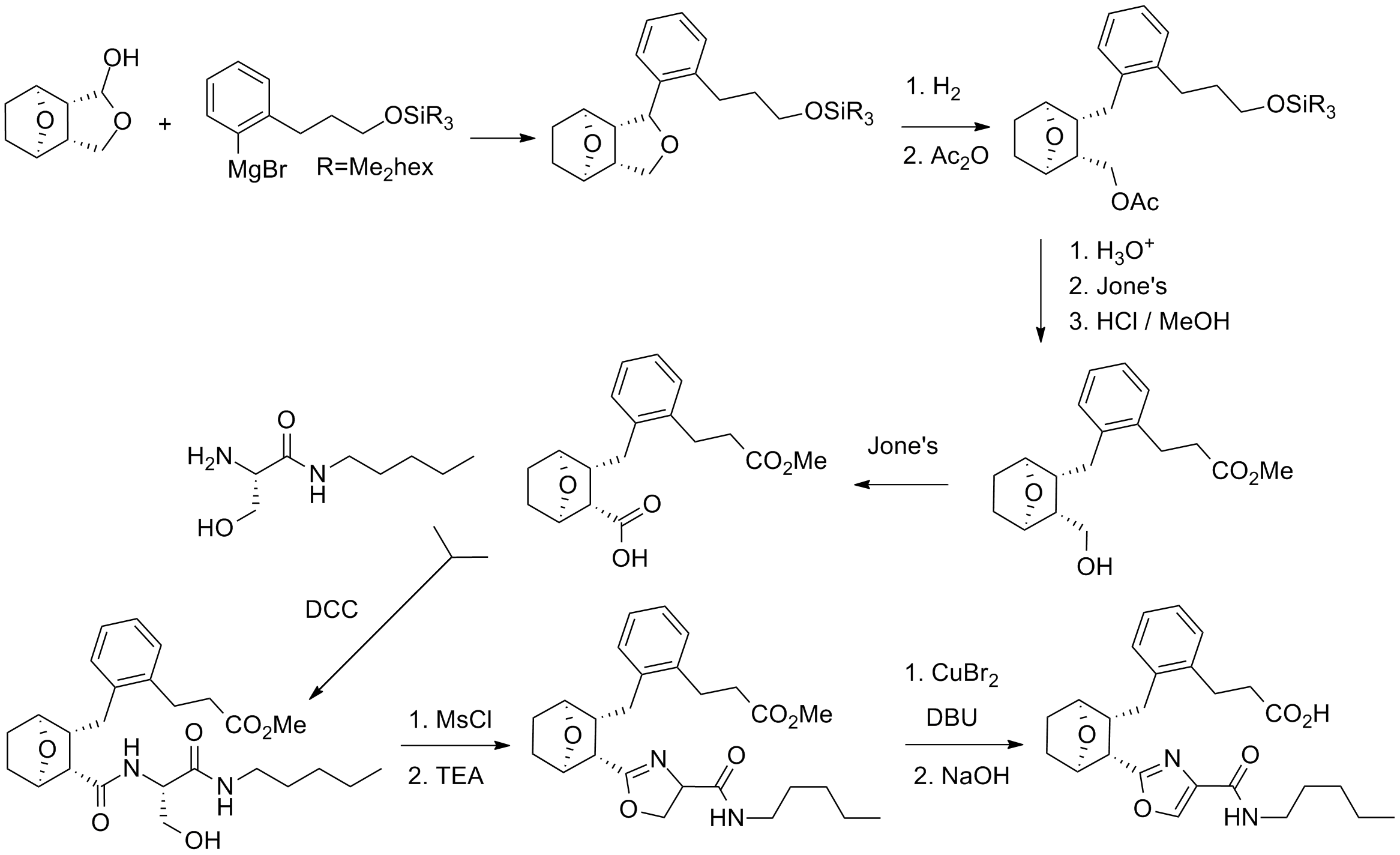
Ifetroban synthesis
