= Atenolol/chlorthalidone =

Combination drug

Combination of
- Atenolol: Beta blocker
- Chlorthalidone: Diuretic

Clinical data
- Trade names: Tenoretic, Tenoret, others
- AHFS/Drugs.com: FDA Professional Drug Information
- License data: US DailyMed: Atenolol_and_chlorthalidone
- Routes of administration: By mouth
- ATC code: C07BB03 (WHO)

Legal status
- Legal status: UK: POM (Prescription only); US: ℞-only

Identifiers
- CAS Number: 73677-19-7
- PubChem CID: 173202
- KEGG: D10592

Atenolol/chlorthalidone, also known as co-tenidone, is a combination medication used to treat high blood pressure. It is made up of atenolol, a beta-blocker and chlortalidone, a diuretic. It is not recommended as an initial treatment but may be used in those who are taking atenolol and chlortalidone individually. It is taken by mouth.

Common side effects include gastrointestinal upset and gout. Serious side effects may include liver problems, pancreatitis, and psychosis. Use is not recommended during pregnancy. Use during breastfeeding may harm the baby. Atenolol works by blocking β1-adrenergic receptors in the heart, thus decreasing the heart rate and workload. Chlorthalidone works by increasing the amount of sodium lost by the kidneys.

The combination was approved for medical use in the United States in 1984. It is available as a generic medication. In 2017, it was the 304th most commonly prescribed medication in the United States, with more than 1 million prescriptions.
