= Temarotene =

Names
- IUPAC name 1,1,4,4-tetramethyl-6-[(E)-1-phenylprop-1-en-2-yl]-2,3-dihydronaphthalene
- Other names Ro 15-0788

Identifiers
CAS Number	75078-91-0
3D model (JSmol)	Interactive image
ChEMBL	ChEMBL554474
ChemSpider	4940787
PubChem CID	6436116
UNII	A28G39IJ7K
- InChI: InChI=1S/C23H28/c1-17(15-18-9-7-6-8-10-18)19-11-12-20-21(16-19)23(4,5)14-13-22(20,2)3/h6-12,15-16H,13-14H2,1-5H3/b17-15+ Key: MUJQTAMVZYFLCR-BMRADRMJSA-N
- SMILES: CC(=CC1=CC=CC=C1)C2=CC3=C(C=C2)C(CCC3(C)C)(C)C

Properties
Chemical formula	C_{23}H_{28}
Molar mass	304.477 g·mol^{−1}
Appearance	Solid powder
Density	0.963 g/cm^{3}
- Except where otherwise noted, data are given for materials in their standard state (at 25 °C [77 °F], 100 kPa). Infobox references

Temarotene is a synthetic arotinoid compound with the molecular formula C_{23}H_{28}. The compound is an orally active drug known for its immunosuppressive and immunostimulatory activities. Temarotene was also studied as a chemopreventive agent.

== Synthesis ==
Synthesis of arotinoid acid and temarotene starts with mixed (Z)-1,2-bis(organylchalcogene)-1-alkene as a precursor.

== Uses ==
Temarotene functions as an orally administered immunomodulator, exhibiting both immunosuppressive and immunostimulatory properties. Studies demonstrate its ability to regulate ornithine decarboxylase (ODC) gene expression in vitro, a mechanism linked to its effects on cellular differentiation and immune response. Temarotene is also used in the study of lichen planus.
