= Zeinoxanthin =

Names
- IUPAC name (1R)-3,5,5-trimethyl-4-[(1E,3E,5E,7E,9E,11E,13E,15E,17E)-3,7,12,16-tetramethyl-18-[(1R)-2,6,6-trimethylcyclohex-2-en-1-yl]octadeca-1,3,5,7,9,11,13,15,17-nonaenyl]cyclohex-3-en-1-ol
- Other names Physoxanthin, 3-Hydroxy-alpha-carotene

Identifiers
CAS Number	24480-38-4
3D model (JSmol)	Interactive image
ChEBI	CHEBI:65244
ChemSpider	4444646
KEGG	C08590
PubChem CID	5281234
UNII	J02CU7E14H
CompTox Dashboard (EPA)	DTXSID40920516
- InChI: InChI=1S/C40H56O/c1-30(18-13-20-32(3)23-25-37-34(5)22-15-27-39(37,7)8)16-11-12-17-31(2)19-14-21-33(4)24-26-38-35(6)28-36(41)29-40(38,9)10/h11-14,16-26,36-37,41H,15,27-29H2,1-10H3/b12-11+,18-13+,19-14+,25-23+,26-24+,30-16+,31-17+,32-20+,33-21+/t36-,37+/m1/s1 Key: NBZANZVJRKXVBH-NHWXEJKLSA-N
- SMILES: CC1=C(C(CC(C1)O)(C)C)C=CC(=CC=CC(=CC=CC=C(C)C=CC=C(C)C=CC2C(=CCCC2(C)C)C)C)C

Properties
Chemical formula	C_{40}H_{56}O
Molar mass	552.887 g·mol^{−1}
- Except where otherwise noted, data are given for materials in their standard state (at 25 °C [77 °F], 100 kPa). Infobox references

Zeinoxanthin is a rare carotenoid with antioxidant properties, commonly found in foods like oranges and also present in the tissues of the human eye.

The word "zeinoxanthin" comes from the Greek words "zeinos", which means "grain", and "xanthus", which means "yellow". The name indicates the presence of this pigment in plants such as corn, in which it can be found.

The compound is closely associated with zeaxanthin and shares comparable antioxidant benefits, playing a role in supporting eye health and shielding against oxidative damage.

== Natural occurrence ==
Zeaxanthin is a yellow pigment found in leafy plants and egg yolks. The compound belongs to the group of xanthines and is found in various plant sources, such as Aplysia, Blechnum, Capsicum, Cladonia, Diospyros, and many others.

== Isolation ==
A crystalline carotenoid zeinoxanthin was identified and isolated from yellow maize kernels. The compound was purified from corn gluten through a multi-step process involving solvent extraction, chromatographic separation, and sequential crystallization in benzene-methanol solvent systems.

== Uses ==
Zeinoxanthin is used in the lutein biosynthesis.

The reaction known to consume the compound:

zeinoxanthin + reduced [NADPH-hemoprotein reductase] + dioxygen → lutein + oxidized [NADPH-hemoprotein reductase] + H_{2}O
