= Picotamide =

Chemical compound

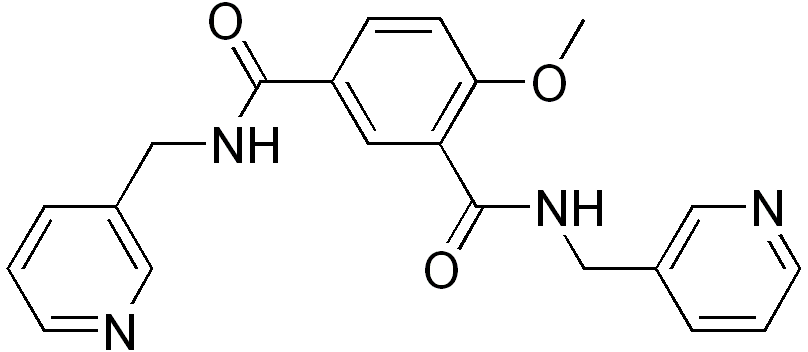

Clinical data
- AHFS/Drugs.com: International Drug Names
- ATC code: B01AC03 (WHO)

Identifiers
- IUPAC name: 4-methoxy-N,N'-bis(pyridin-3-ylmethyl)isophthalamide
- CAS Number: 32828-81-2 80530-63-8 (monohydrate)
- PubChem CID: 4814
- ChemSpider: 4649
- UNII: 654G2VCI4Q
- CompTox Dashboard (EPA): DTXSID40186498
- ECHA InfoCard: 100.046.572

Chemical and physical data
- Formula: C_{21}H_{20}N_{4}O_{3}
- Molar mass: 376.416 g·mol^{−1}
- 3D model (JSmol): Interactive image
- SMILES: O=C(NCc1cccnc1)c3cc(C(=O)NCc2cccnc2)c(OC)cc3
- InChI: InChI=1S/C21H20N4O3/c1-28-19-7-6-17(20(26)24-13-15-4-2-8-22-11-15)10-18(19)21(27)25-14-16-5-3-9-23-12-16/h2-12H,13-14H2,1H3,(H,24,26)(H,25,27); Key:KYWCWBXGRWWINE-UHFFFAOYSA-N

Picotamide is a platelet aggregation inhibitor. It works as a thromboxane synthase inhibitor and a thromboxane receptor inhibitor, the latter by modifying cellular responses to activation of the thromboxane receptor. Picotamide is licensed in Italy for the treatment of clinical arterial thrombosis and peripheral artery disease.
