= Tetrabarbital =

Chemical compound

Clinical data
- ATC code: None

Identifiers
- IUPAC name: 5-ethyl-5-(hexan-3-yl)pyrimidine-2,4,6(1H,3H,5H)-trione
- CAS Number: 76-23-3
- PubChem CID: 101534
- ChemSpider: 91745
- UNII: 3K441526FO
- CompTox Dashboard (EPA): DTXSID50861623
- ECHA InfoCard: 100.000.861

Chemical and physical data
- Formula: C_{12}H_{20}N_{2}O_{3}
- Molar mass: 240.303 g·mol^{−1}
- 3D model (JSmol): Interactive image
- SMILES: O=C1NC(=O)NC(=O)C1(C(CC)CCC)CC
- InChI: InChI=1S/C12H20N2O3/c1-4-7-8(5-2)12(6-3)9(15)13-11(17)14-10(12)16/h8H,4-7H2,1-3H3,(H2,13,14,15,16,17); Key:ZLUNGGZJSQDFPH-UHFFFAOYSA-N

Tetrabarbital (INN; Butysal, Butysedal, Tetramal) is a barbiturate derivative used as a hypnotic.

== See also ==
- Barbiturate
- Pentobarbital
