= Thromboxane A2 =

Thromboxane A_{2}

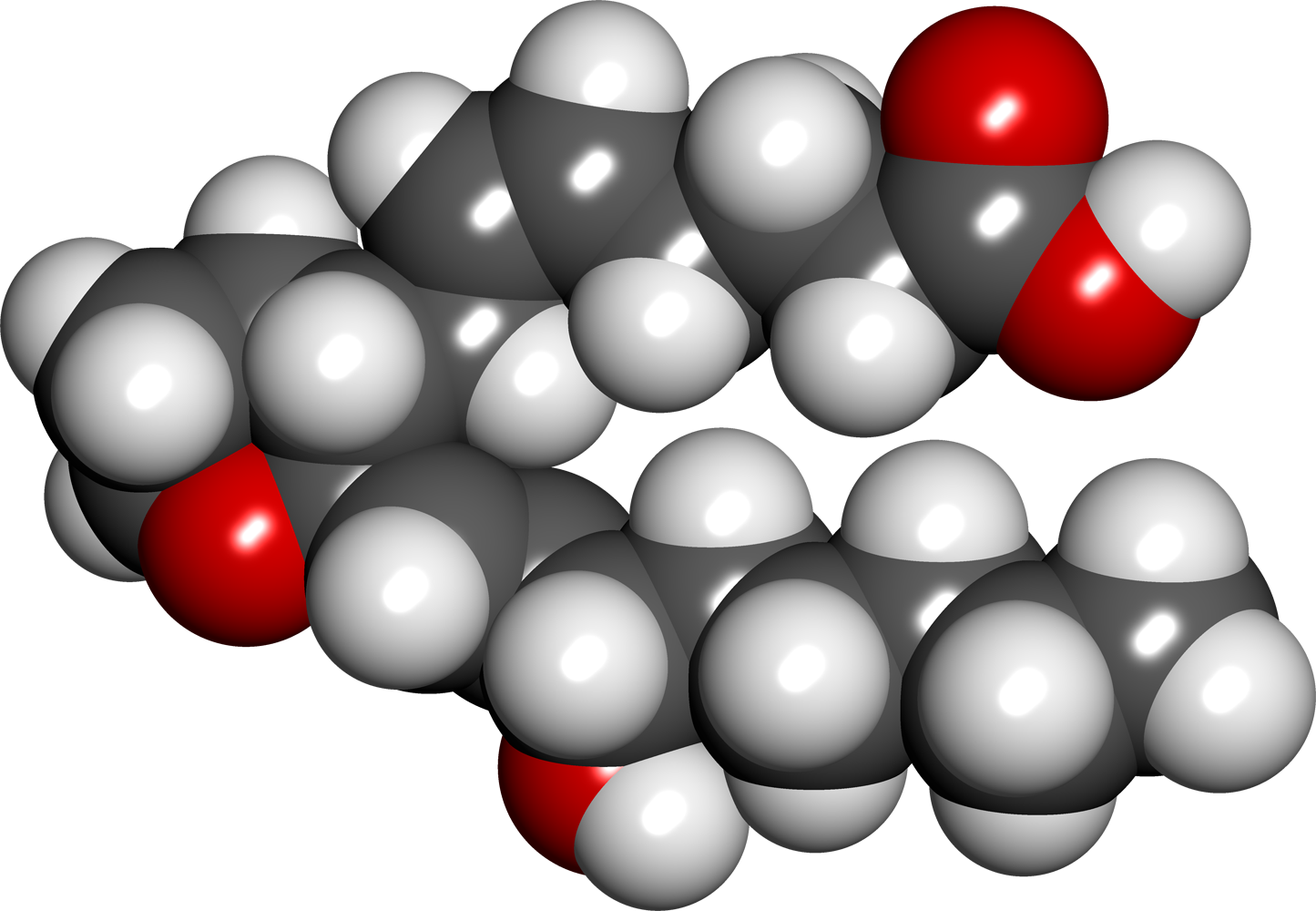

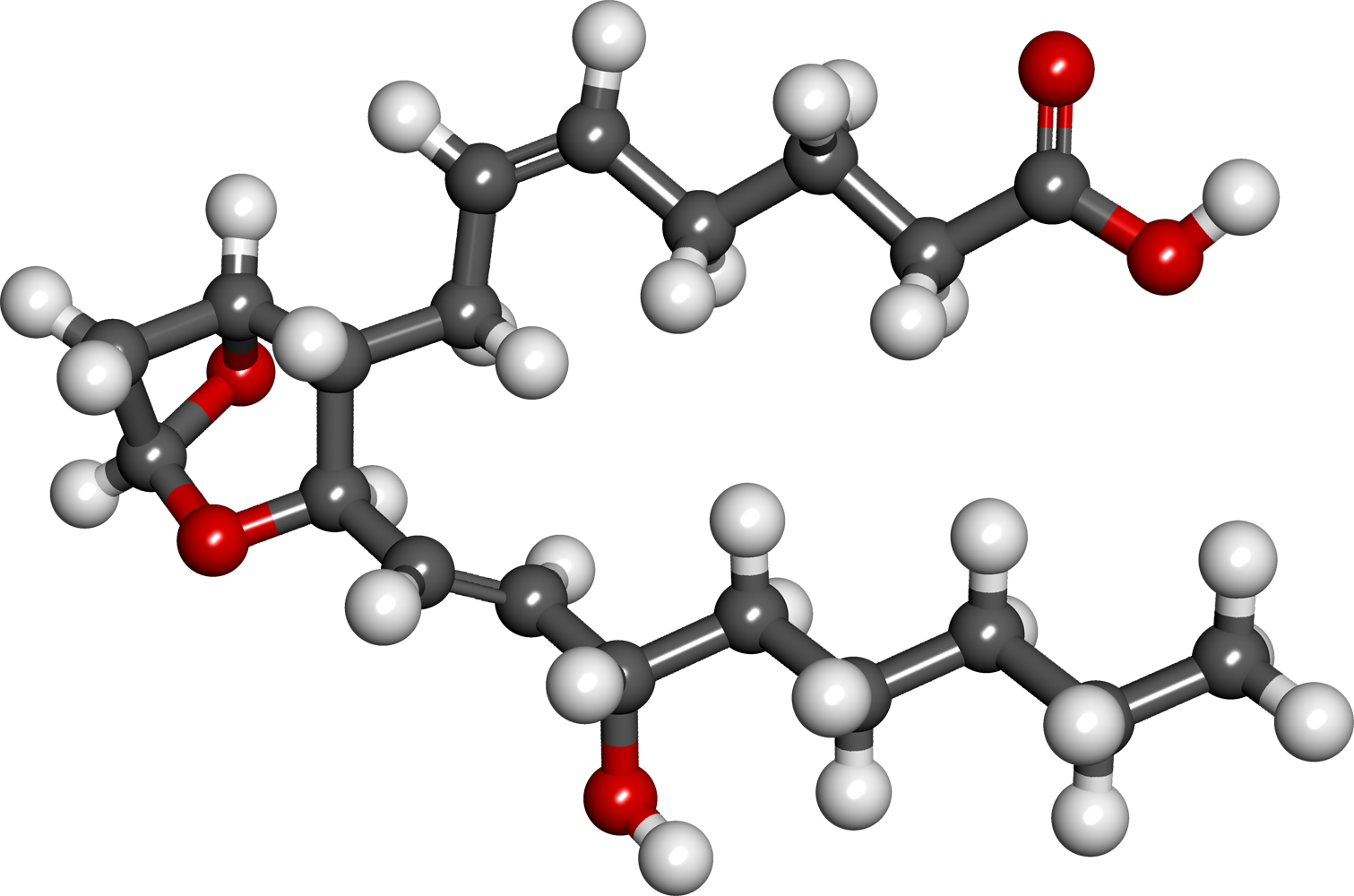

Identifiers
CAS Number	57576-52-0
3D model (JSmol)	Interactive image
ChEBI	CHEBI:15627
ChemSpider	4444137
IUPHAR/BPS	4482
KEGG	C02198
MeSH	Thromboxane+A2
PubChem CID	5280497
UNII	4C2A5G825S
CompTox Dashboard (EPA)	DTXSID201317452
- InChI: InChI=1S/C20H32O5/c1-2-3-6-9-15(21)12-13-17-16(18-14-20(24-17)25-18)10-7-4-5-8-11-19(22)23/h4,7,12-13,15-18,20-21H,2-3,5-6,8-11,14H2,1H3,(H,22,23)/b7-4-,13-12+/t15-,16+,17+,18-,20+/m0/s1 Key: DSNBHJFQCNUKMA-SCKDECHMSA-N
- SMILES: CCCCC[C@@H](/C=C/[C@@H]1[C@H]([C@@H]2C[C@@H](O2)O1)C/C=C\CCCC(=O)O)O

Properties
Chemical formula	C_{20}H_{32}O_{5}
Molar mass	352.471 g·mol^{−1}
- Except where otherwise noted, data are given for materials in their standard state (at 25 °C [77 °F], 100 kPa). verify (what is ?) Infobox references

Thromboxane A_{2} (TXA_{2}) is a type of thromboxane that is produced by activated platelets during hemostasis and has prothrombotic properties: it stimulates activation of new platelets as well as increases platelet aggregation. This is achieved by activating the thromboxane receptor, which results in platelet-shape change, inside-out activation of integrins, and degranulation. Circulating fibrinogen binds these receptors on adjacent platelets, further strengthening the clot. TXA_{2} is also a known vasoconstrictor and is especially important during tissue injury and inflammation. It is also regarded as responsible for Prinzmetal's angina.

Receptors that mediate TXA_{2} actions are thromboxane A_{2} receptors. The human TXA_{2} receptor (TP) is a typical G protein-coupled receptor (GPCR) with seven transmembrane segments. In humans, two TP receptor splice variants – TPα and TPβ – have so far been cloned.

== Synthesis and breakdown ==
Thromboxane A_{2} (TXA_{2}) is generated from prostaglandin H_{2} by thromboxane-A synthase in a metabolic reaction which generates approximately equal amounts of 12-hydroxyheptadecatrienoic acid (12-HHT). Aspirin irreversibly inhibits platelet cyclooxygenase 1 preventing the formation of prostaglandin H_{2}, and therefore TXA_{2}. Contrastly, TXA_{2} vascular tissue synthesis is stimulated by angiotensin II which promotes cyclooxygenase I's metabolism of arachidonic acid. An angiotensin II dependent pathway also induces hypertension and interacts with TXA_{2} receptors.

TXA_{2} is very unstable in aqueous solution, since it is hydrated within about 30 seconds to the biologically inactive thromboxane B2. 12-HHT, while once thought to be an inactive byproduct of TXA_{2} synthesis, has recently been shown to have a range of potentially important actions, some of which relate to the actions of TXA_{2} (see 12-Hydroxyheptadecatrienoic acid). Due to its very short half-life, TXA_{2} primarily functions as an autocrine or paracrine mediator in the nearby tissues surrounding its site of production. Most work in the field of TXA_{2} is done instead with synthetic analogs such as U46619 and I-BOP. In human studies, 11-dehydrothromboxane B2 levels are used to indirectly measure TXA_{2} production.

Eicosanoid synthesis.
