= Thromboxane-A synthase =

Mammalian protein found in Homo sapiens

TBXAS1

Identifiers
- Aliases: TBXAS1, BDPLT14, CYP5, CYP5A1, GHOSAL, THAS, TS, TXAS, TXS, thromboxane A synthase 1
- External IDs: OMIM: 274180; MGI: 98497; GeneCards: TBXAS1
Enzyme activity
EC #	BRENDA	ExPASy	KEGG	MetaCyc
4.2.1.152	↗	↗	↗	↗
5.3.99.5	↗	↗	↗	↗

Gene location (Human)
Chr.	Chromosome 7 (human)
Band	7q34	Start	139,777,051 bp
Band	7q34	End	140,020,325 bp

Gene location (Mouse)
Chr.	Chromosome 6 (mouse)
Band	6 B1|6 17.85 cM	Start	38,852,338 bp
Band	6 B1|6 17.85 cM	End	39,061,519 bp
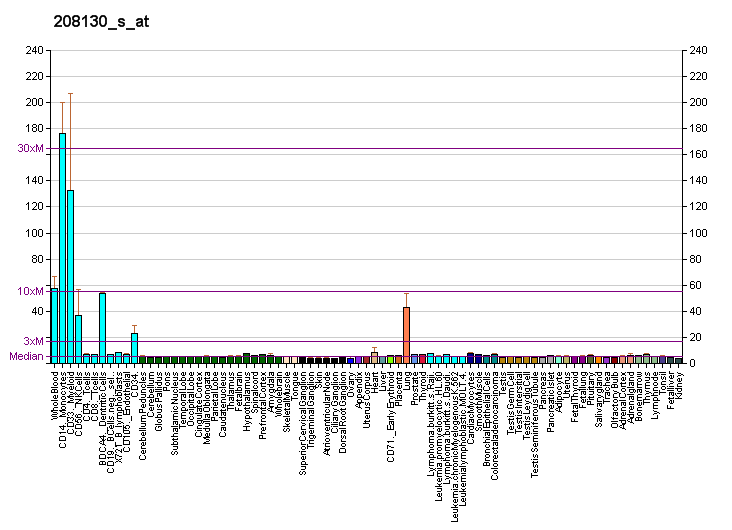
RNA expression pattern
Bgee	Human / Mouse (ortholog); Top expressed in: monocyte; granulocyte; blood; spleen; right lung; gallbladder; upper lobe of left lung; C1 segment; rectum; minor salivary glands / Top expressed in: granulocyte; stroma of bone marrow; gastrula; blood; right kidney; mesenteric lymph nodes; spleen; ascending aorta; aortic valve; CA3 field; More reference expression data
BioGPS	More reference expression data
Gene ontology
Molecular function	iron ion binding; isomerase activity; metal ion binding; monooxygenase activity; heme binding; oxidoreductase activity, acting on paired donors, with incorporation or reduction of molecular oxygen; oxidoreductase activity; 12-hydroxyheptadecatrienoic acid synthase activity; thromboxane-A synthase activity
Cellular component	integral component of membrane; endoplasmic reticulum membrane; membrane; endoplasmic reticulum
Biological process	prostaglandin metabolic process; lipid metabolism; icosanoid metabolic process; cyclooxygenase pathway; fatty acid metabolic process; fatty acid biosynthetic process; prostaglandin biosynthetic process
Sources:Amigo / QuickGO
Orthologs
Databases	NCBI: entry; OMA: entry
Species	Human	Mouse
Entrez	6916	21391
Ensembl	ENSG00000059377	ENSMUSG00000029925
UniProt	P24557	P36423
RefSeq (mRNA)	NM_001314028; NM_001061; NM_001130966; NM_001166253; NM_001166254 NM_030984; NM_001366537; NM_001366538	NM_011539
RefSeq (protein)	NP_001052; NP_001124438; NP_001159725; NP_001159726; NP_001300957 NP_112246; NP_001353466; NP_001353467	NP_035669
Location (UCSC)	Chr 7: 139.78 – 140.02 Mb	Chr 6: 38.85 – 39.06 Mb
PubMed search
- Wikidata
View/Edit Human	View/Edit Mouse

Thromboxane A synthase 1 (EC 5.3.99.5, platelet, cytochrome P450, family 5, subfamily A), also known as TBXAS1, is a cytochrome P450 enzyme that, in humans, is encoded by the TBXAS1 gene.

== Function ==
This gene encodes a member of the cytochrome P450 superfamily of enzymes. The cytochrome P450 proteins are monooxygenases that catalyze many reactions involved in drug metabolism and synthesis of cholesterol, steroids, and other lipids. However, this protein is considered a member of the cytochrome P450 superfamily on the basis of sequence similarity rather than functional similarity. This endoplasmic reticulum membrane protein catalyzes the conversion of prostaglandin H_{2} to thromboxane A_{2}, a potent vasoconstrictor and inducer of platelet aggregation, and also to 12-Hydroxyheptadecatrienoic acid (i.e. 12-(S)-hydroxy-5Z,8E,10E-heptadecatrienoic acid or 12-HHT) an agonist of Leukotriene B4 receptors (i.e. BLT2 receptors) and mediator of certain BLT2 receptor actions. The enzyme plays a role in several pathophysiological processes including hemostasis, cardiovascular disease, and stroke. The gene expresses two transcript variants.

== Thromboxane synthase inhibitors ==
Thromboxane synthase inhibitors are used as antiplatelet drugs. Picotamide acts both as a thromboxane synthase inhibitor and as a thromboxane receptor antagonist.

== Structure ==
The human thromboxane A (TXA) synthase is a 60 kDa cytochrome P450 protein with 533 amino acids and a heme prosthetic group. This enzyme, anchored to the endoplasmic reticulum, is found in platelets, monocytes, and several other cell types. The NH2 terminus contains two hydrophobic segments whose secondary structure is believed to be helical. Evidence suggests that the peptides serve as a membrane anchor for the enzyme. Moreover, the study of cDNA clones made possible by polymerase chain reaction techniques has further elucidated the TXA synthase's primary structure. Similar to other members in the cytochrome P450 family, TXA synthase has a heme group coordinated to the thiolate group of a cysteine residue, specifically cysteine 480. Mutagenesis studies that made substitutions at that position resulted in loss of catalytic activity and minimal heme binding. Other residues that had similar results were W133, R478, N110, and R413. Located near the heme propionate groups or the distal face of the heme, these residues are also important for proper integration of heme into the apoprotein. Unfortunately, researchers have found it difficult to obtain a crystal structure of TXA synthase due to the requirement of detergent treatment extraction from the membrane but they have utilized homology modeling to create a 3D structure. One model showed two domains, an alpha-helix-rich domain and a beta-sheet-rich domain. The heme was found to be sandwiched between helices I and L.

== Mechanism ==
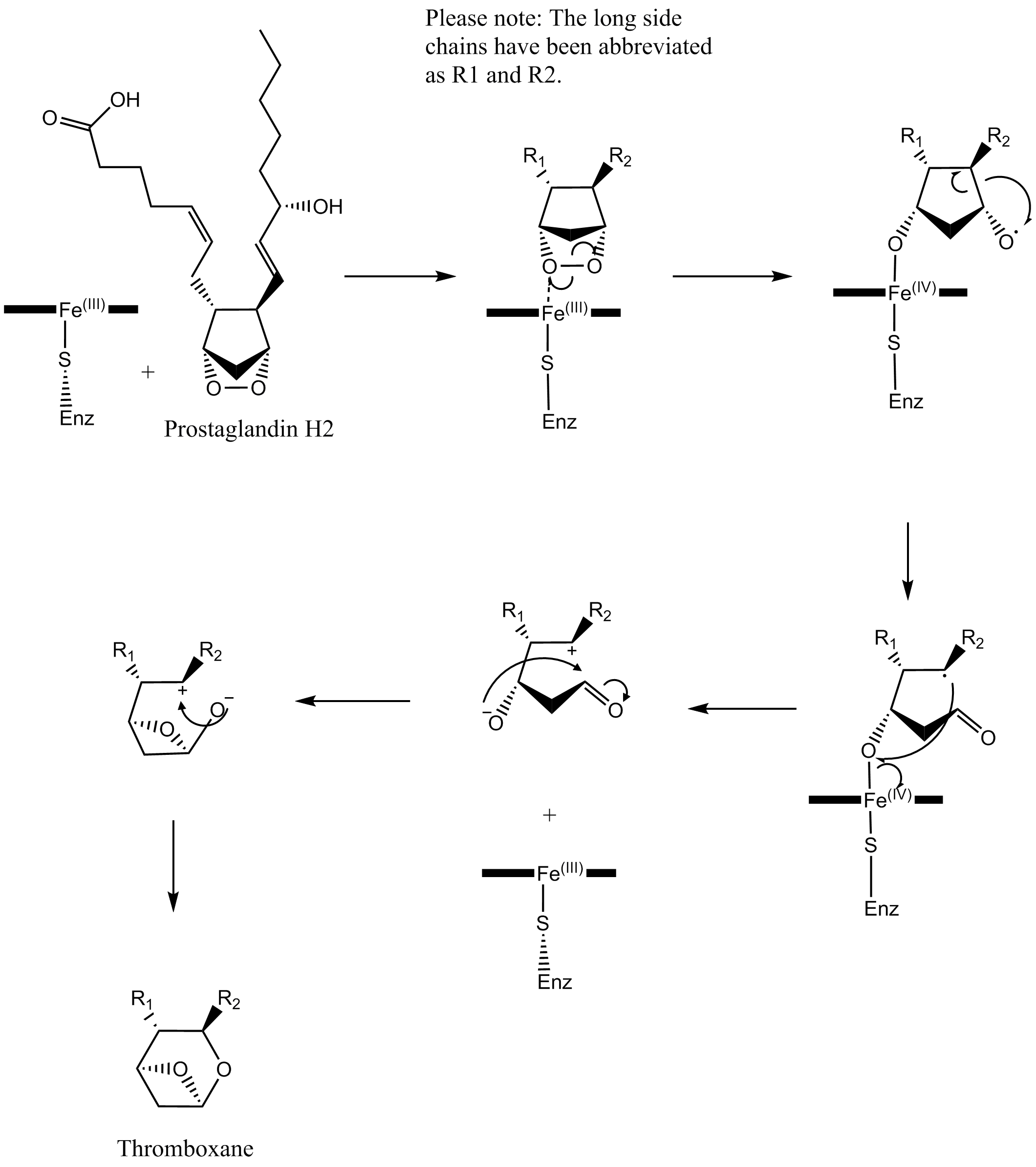
This isomerization mechanism shows prostaglandin H2 being converted to thromboxane. A heme group coordinated to a cysteine residue from the enzyme, thromboxane synthase, is involved in the mechanism.

Thromboxane A (TXA) is derived from the prostaglandin H2 (PGH2) molecule. PGH2 contains a relatively weak epidioxy bond, and a possible mechanism is known to involve homolytic cleavage of the epidioxide and a rearrangement to TXA. A heme group in the active site of TXA synthase plays an important role in the mechanism. Stopped-flow kinetic studies with a substrate analog and recombinant TXA synthase revealed that substrate binding occurs in two steps. First, there is a fast initial binding to the protein and then a subsequent ligation to the heme iron. In the first step of the mechanism, the heme iron coordinates to the C-9 endoperoxide oxygen. It participates in homolytic cleavage of the O-O bond in the endoperoxide, which represents the rate-limiting step, and undergoes a change in redox state from Fe(III) to Fe(IV). A free oxygen radical forms at C-11, and this intermediate undergoes ring cleavage. With the free radical now at C-12, the iron heme then oxidizes this radical to a carbocation. The molecule is now ready for intramolecular ring formation. The negatively charged oxygen attacks the carbonyl, and the electrons from one of the double bonds are drawn to the carbocation, thus closing the ring.

== Biological significance ==
Maintaining a balance between prostacyclins and thromboxanes is important in the body, particularly because these two eicosanoids exert opposing effects. In catalyzing the synthesis of thromboxanes, TXA synthase is involved in a flux pathway that can modulate the amount of thromboxane produced. This control becomes an important factor in several processes, such as blood pressure regulation, clotting, and inflammatory responses. Dysregulation of TXA synthase and an imbalance in the prostacyclin-thromboxane ratio are thought to underlie many pathological conditions, such as pulmonary hypertension. Because thromboxanes play a role in vasoconstriction and platelet aggregation, their dominance can disrupt vascular homeostasis and cause thrombotic vascular events. Furthermore, the importance of thromboxanes and their syntheses in vascular homeostasis is illustrated by findings that patients whose platelets were unresponsive to TXA displayed hemostatic defects and that a deficiency of platelet TXA production led to bleeding disorders.

Furthermore, it has been found that the expression of TXA synthase may be of critical importance to the development and progression of cancer. An overall increase in TXA synthase expression has been observed in a variety of cancers, such as papillary thyroid carcinoma, prostate cancer, and renal cancer. Cancer cells are known for their limitless cellular replicative potential, and it has been hypothesized that changes in eicosanoid profile affect cancer growth. Research has led to the proposal that TXA synthase contributes to a range of tumor survival pathways, including growth, apoptosis inhibition, angiogenesis, and metastasis.

== Pathway ==
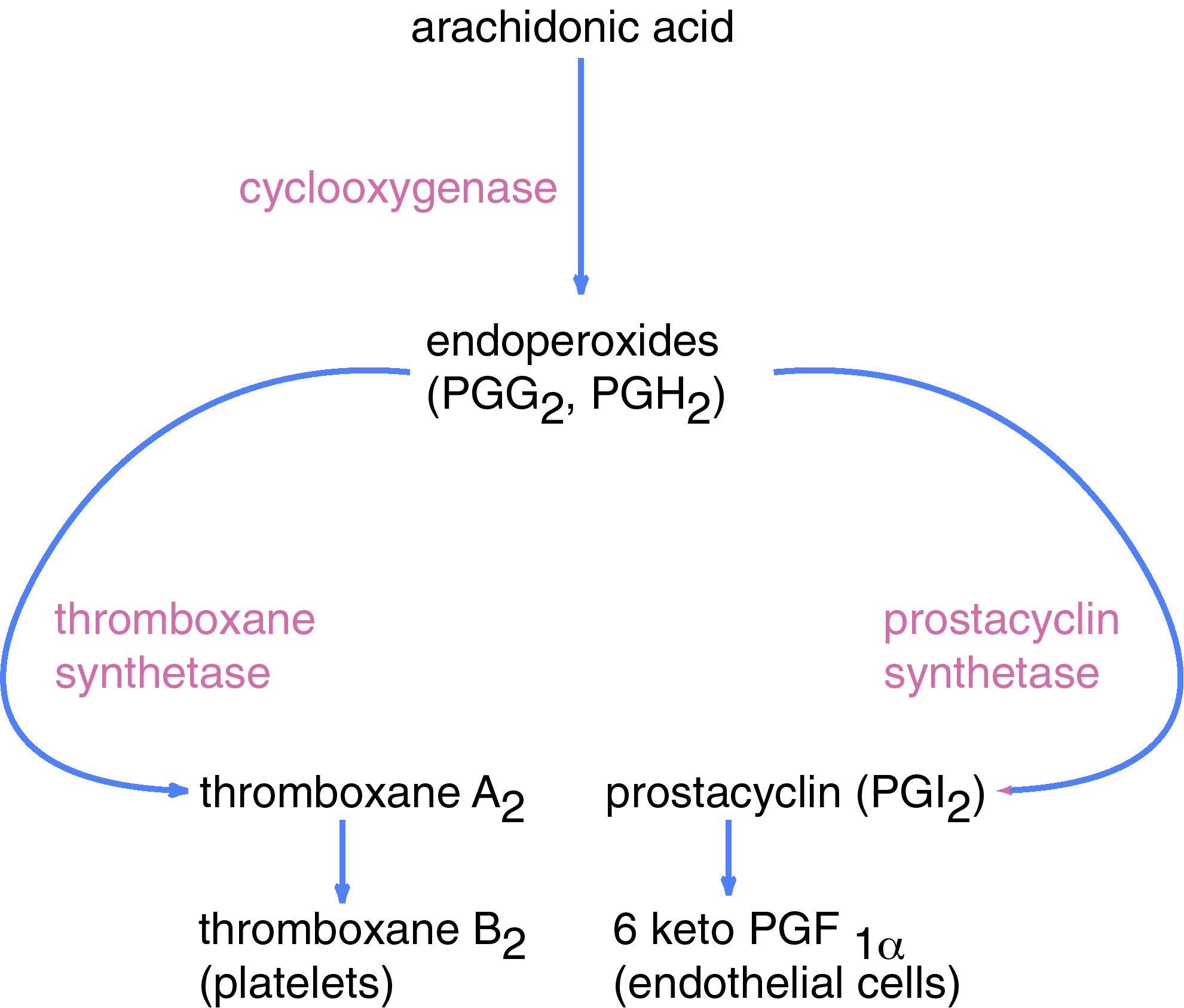
Thromboxane synthesis

Eicosanoid synthesis

== See also ==
- Prostanoid
- 12-Hydroxyheptadecatrienoic acid
