= Tak =

Tak or TAK may refer to:

== Places ==
- Dağdöşü or Tak, Azerbaijan, a village
- Taq, Iran or Tak, a village
- Tak province, Thailand
  - Tak, Thailand, capital of the province

== Entertainment ==
- Total Annihilation: Kingdoms or TA:K
- Tak, title character of Tak and the Power of Juju, a video game, and Tak and the Power of Juju (TV series)
- Tak (Stephen King), a character in novels by King
- Tak, a character in Invader Zim
- Tak, a character from the novel Lord of Light by Roger Zelazny
- Tak (game), an abstract strategy board game
- TAK ensemble, a New York City-based contemporary chamber ensemble

== Transport ==
- Takamatsu Airport's IATA code
- Tallinna Autobussikoondis
- Tai Koo station's station code in Hong Kong
- Tatarstan Airlines's ICAO code

== People ==
- Tak (surname), a Dutch, English, Indian, and Korean surname, including a list of people with the surname
- Tak (given name), a list of people with the given name or nickname
- Seomoon Tak, stage name of South Korean rock singer Lee Su-jin (born 1978)
- Young Tak, South Korean singer, songwriter, actor and television personality Park Young-tak (born 1983)
- Tak (clan) - a Rajput clan of India

== Other uses ==
- TAK, abbreviation of the Turkish Agency Cyprus
- Tak (function), in mathematics
- Tak F.C., a football club in Tak Province, Thailand
- Taal Aktie Komitee, the language action committee within the Flemish Movement
- Teyrêbazên Azadiya Kurdistan or Kurdistan Freedom Hawks
- Rindu Tak Berujung, an Indonesian soap opera television series
- Takeda Pharmaceutical Company, NYSE ticker symbol

== See also ==
- Tak Dam (disambiguation)
- Taku (disambiguation)
- Takk (disambiguation)
- Tac (disambiguation)
- Tack (disambiguation)
- Yes (Tak in some Slavic languages)
