= Copper-64 =

Isotope of copper emitting both beta+ and beta- and used in PET scan

General
- Symbol: ^{64}Cu
- Names: copper-64
- Protons (Z): 29
- Neutrons (N): 35

Nuclide data
- Half-life (t_{1/2}): 12.700 h
- Isotope mass: 63.929764 Da
- Decay products: ^{64}Ni^{64}Zn

Decay modes
- Decay mode: Decay energy (MeV)
- Beta-minus: 0.580
- Beta-plus (positron emission): 0.653
- Electron capture: 1.675

Copper-64 (^{64}Cu) is a positron- and beta-emitting isotope of copper (exhibiting both forms of beta decay), with applications in molecular radiotherapy and positron emission tomography. Its unusually long half-life (12.7 hours) for a positron-emitting isotope makes it increasingly useful when attached to various ligands for PET and PET-CT scanning.

== Properties ==
^{64}Cu has a half-life of 12.70 hours and decays 61.5% of the time to ^{64}Ni, of which 17.5% is positron emission and 44% by electron capture, and 38.5% by beta decay to ^{64}Zn. The electron-capture branch emits a 1.346-MeV gamma ray in 0.472% of all decays, which could be used for tracing the isotope.

== Production ==
Copper-64 can be produced by several different methods with the most common methods using either a reactor or a particle accelerator. Thermal neutrons can produce ^{64}Cu in low specific activity (the number of decays per second per amount of substance) and low yield through the ^{63}Cu(n,γ)^{64}Cu reaction. At the University of Missouri Research Reactor Center (MURR) ^{64}Cu was produced using high-energy neutrons via the ^{64}Zn(n,p)^{64}Cu nuclear reaction in high specific activity but low yield. Using a biomedical cyclotron the ^{64}Ni(p,n)^{64}Cu nuclear reaction can produce large quantities of the nuclide with high specific activity.

== Applications ==
As a positron emitter, ^{64}Cu has been used to produce experimental and clinical radiopharmaceuticals for the imaging of a range of conditions. Its beta emissions also raise the possibility of therapeutic applications. Compared to typical PET radionuclides it has a relatively long half-life, which can be advantageous for therapy, and for imaging certain physiological processes.

=== PET imaging ===
==== Bone metastases ====
Experimental preclinical work has shown that ^{64}Cu linked to methanephosphonate functional groups has potential as a bone imaging agent.

==== Neuroendocrine tumors (NETs) ====
Neuroendocrine tumors (NETs) are localised clinically using a range of DOTA based radiopharmaceuticals. For PET imaging these are typically Gallium-68 based. A commercial ^{64}Cu-DOTA-TATE product has been FDA approved for localization of somatostatin receptor positive NETs since 2020.

==== Prostate cancer ====
The Bombesin peptide has been shown to be overexpressed in BB2 receptors in prostate cancer. CB-TE2A a stable chelation system for ^{64}Cu was incorporated with Bombesin analogs for in vitro and in vivo studies of prostate cancer. PET-CT imagining studies showed that it underwent uptake into prostate tumor xenografts selectively with decreased uptake into non target tissues. Other preclinical studies have shown that by targeting the gastrin-releasing peptide receptor pancreatic and breast cancer can also be detected.

==== Renal perfusion ====
Ethylglyoxal bis(thiosemicarbazone) (ETS) has potential utility as a PET radiopharmaceutical with the various isotopes of copper. ^{64}Cu-ETS has been used for experimental preclinical myocardial, cerebral and tumor perfusion evaluations, with a linear relationship between the renal uptake and blood flow. Renal perfusion can also be evaluated with CT or MRI instead of PET, but with drawbacks: CT requires administration of potentially allergenic contrast agents. MRI avoids use of ionising radiation but is difficult to implement, and often suffers from motion artefacts. PET with ^{64}Cu can offer quantitative measurements of renal perfusion.

==== Wilson’s disease ====
Wilson's disease is a rare condition in which copper is retained excessively in the body. Toxic levels of copper can lead to organ failure and premature death. ^{64}Cu has been used experimentally to study whole body retention of copper in subjects with this disease. The technique can also separate heterozygous carriers and homozygous normals.

=== Cancer therapy ===
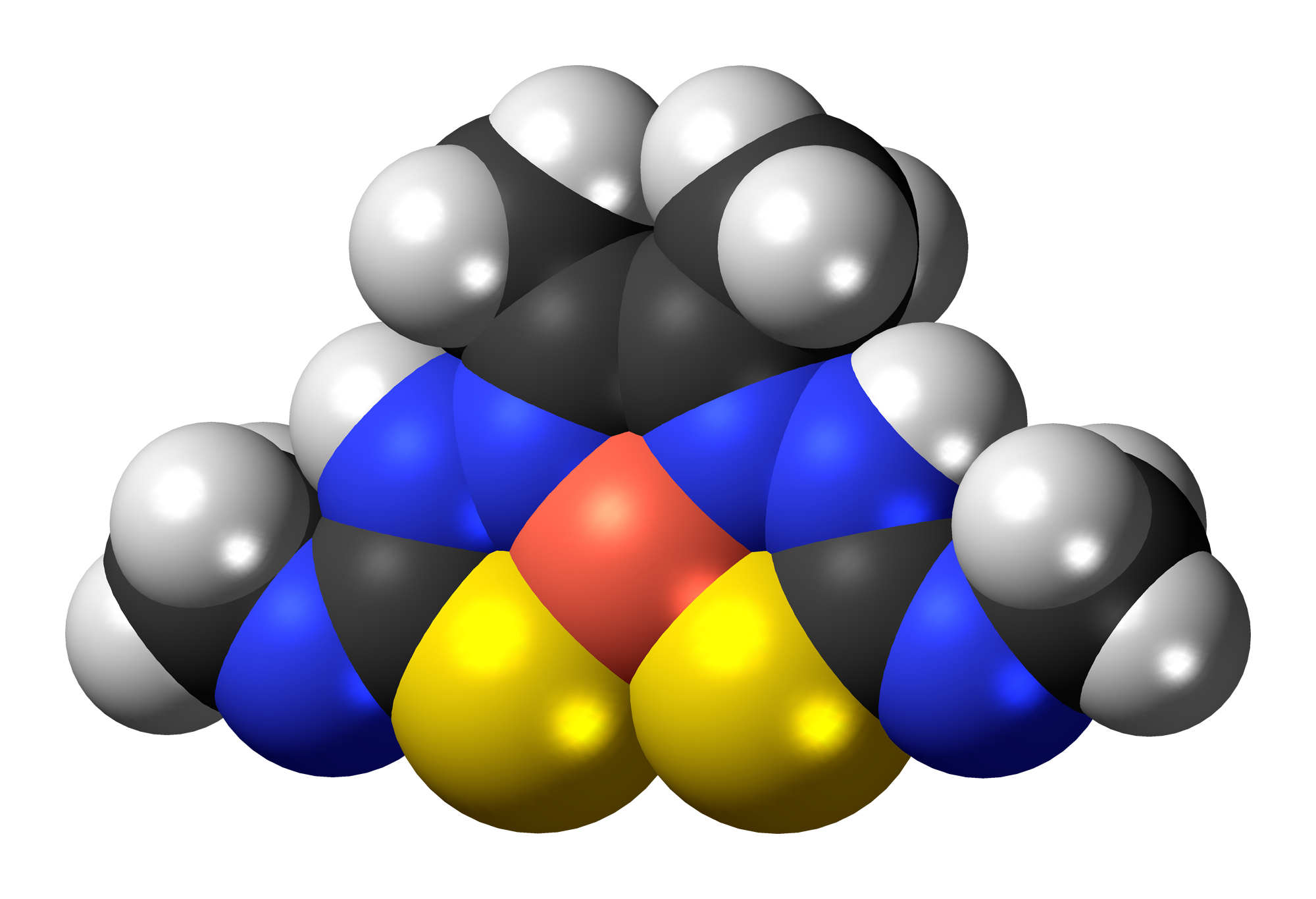
^{64}Cu-ATSM – copper(II) (diacetyl-bis (N4-methylthiosemicarbazone)) – is being studied as a possible cancer therapy.

^{64}Cu-ATSM (diacetyl-bis(N4-methylthiosemicarbazone)) has been shown to increase the survival time of tumor-bearing animals. Areas of low oxygen retention have been shown to be resistant to external beam radiotherapy because hypoxia reduces the lethal effects of ionizing radiation. ^{64}Cu was believed to kill these cells because of its unique decay properties. In animal models having colorectal tumors with and without induced hypoxia, Cu-ATSM was preferentially taken up by hypoxic cells over normoxic cells. The results demonstrated that this compound increased survival of the tumor bearing hamsters compared with controls.

== See also ==
- Nuclear medicine
- Radioactive tracer
- Radionuclide
- Radiopharmacology
