= PET for bone imaging =

Medical imaging technique

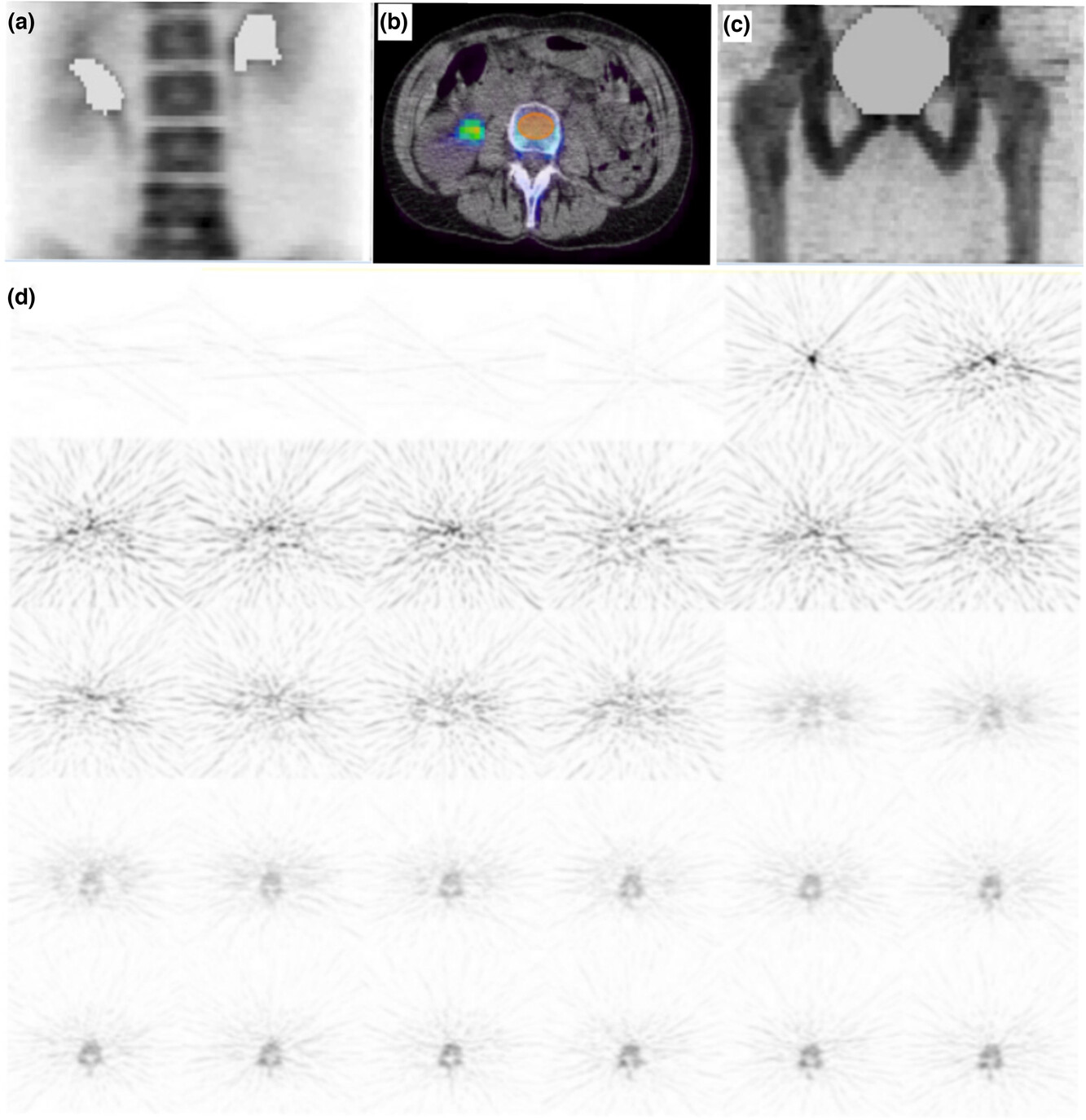
(a) Coronal PET slice of lumbar spine (LS); (b) Transaxial PET-CT showing ROI (orange) capturing trabecular bone only; (c) Coronal PET of upper femur with kidney/bladder signals removed for clarity; (d) Dynamic [^{18}F]NaF PET of LS, transaxial slice over 0–60 min post-injection.

Positron emission tomography for bone imaging, as an in vivo tracer technique, allows the measurement of the regional concentration of radioactivity proportional to the image pixel values averaged over a region of interest (ROI) in bones. Positron emission tomography is a functional imaging technique that uses [^{18}F]NaF radiotracer to visualise and quantify regional bone metabolism and blood flow. [^{18}F]NaF has been used for imaging bones for the last 60 years. This article focuses on the pharmacokinetics of [^{18}F]NaF in bones, and various semi-quantitative and quantitative methods for quantifying regional bone metabolism using [^{18}F]NaF PET images.

== Use of [^{18}F]NaF PET ==
The measurement of regional bone metabolism is critical to understand the pathophysiology of metabolic bone diseases.

- Bone biopsy is considered the gold standard to quantify bone turnover; however, it is invasive, complex and costly to perform and subject to significant measurement errors.
- Measurements of serum or urine biomarkers of bone turnover are simple, cheap, quick, and non-invasive in measuring changes in bone metabolism, but only provide information on the global skeleton.
- The functional imaging technique of dynamic [^{18}F]NaF PET scans can quantify regional bone turnover at specific sites of clinical importance such as the lumbar spine and hip and has been validated by comparison with the gold standard of bone biopsy.

== Pharmacokinetics of [^{18}F]NaF ==
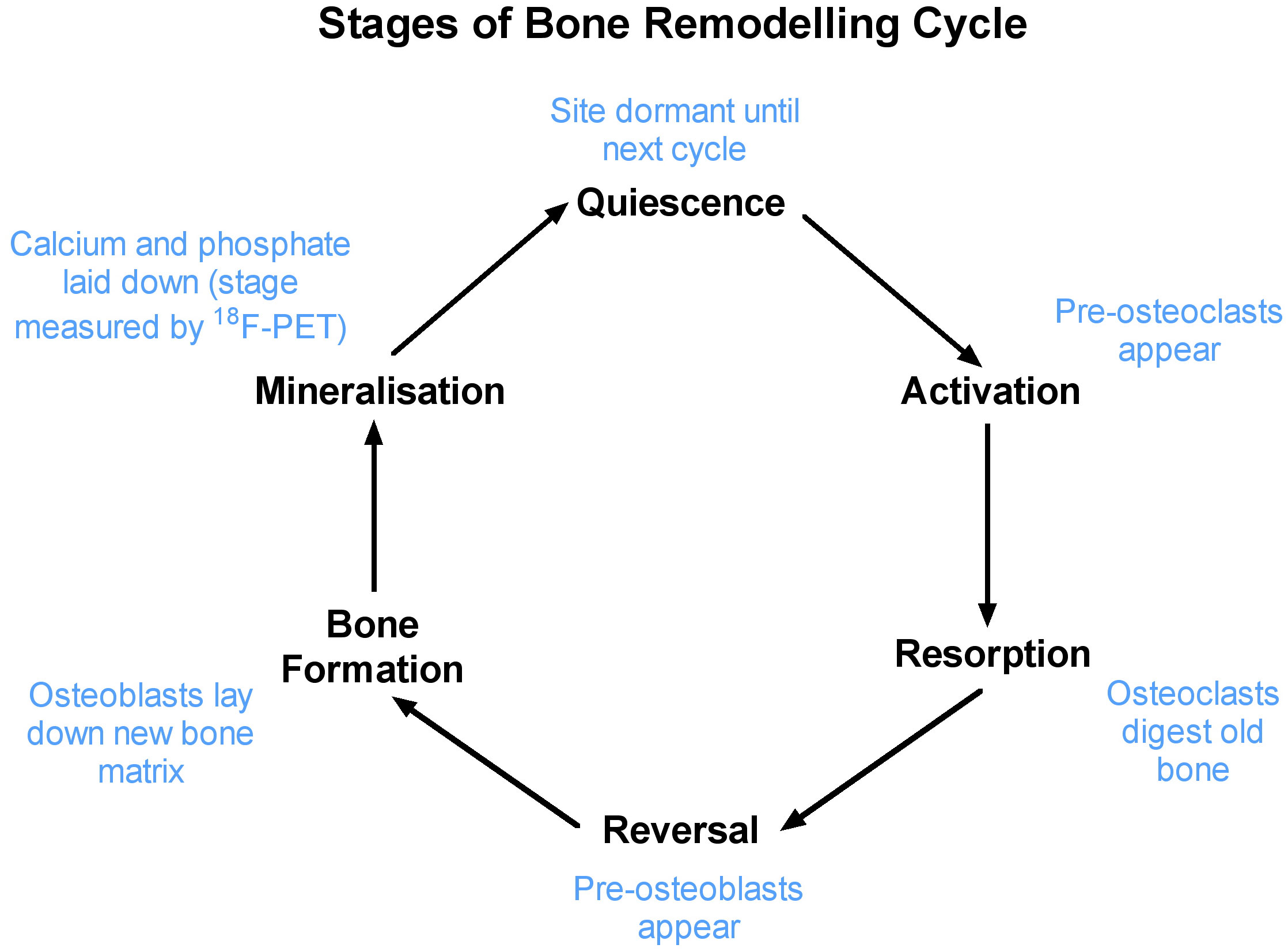
Bone remodeling is a six-stage cycle: (1) Quiescent phase with no activity; (2) Activation by osteocytes; (3) Resorption by osteoclasts; (4) Reversal phase prepares surface; (5) Formation by osteoblasts; (6) Mineralization deposits hydroxyapatite. Bone-targeting radionuclides integrate during mineralization. The cycle then returns to quiescence.

The chemically stable anion of Fluorine-18-Fluoride is a bone-seeking radiotracer in skeletal imaging. [^{18}F]NaF has an affinity to deposit at areas where the bone is newly mineralizing. Many studies have [^{18}F]NaF PET to measure bone metabolism at the hip, lumbar spine, and humerus. [^{18}F]NaF is taken-up in an exponential manner representing the equilibration of tracer with the extracellular and cellular fluid spaces with a half-life of 0.4 hours, and with kidneys with a half-life of 2.4 hours. The single passage extraction of [^{18}F]NaF in bone is 100%. After an hour, only 10% of the injected activity remains in the blood.

^{18}F- ions are considered to occupy extracellular fluid spaces because, firstly, they equilibrate with transcellular fluid spaces and secondly, they are not entirely extracellular ions. Fluoride undergoes equilibrium with hydrogen fluoride, which has a high permeability allowing fluoride to cross the plasma blood membrane. The fluoride circulation in red blood cells accounts for 30%. However, it is freely available to the bone surface for uptake because the equilibrium between erythrocytes and plasma is much faster than the capillary transit time. This is supported by studies reporting 100% single-passage extraction of whole-blood ^{18}F- ion by bone and the rapid release of ^{18}F- ions from erythrocytes with a rate constant of 0.3 per second.

[^{18}F]NaF is also taken-up by immature erythrocytes in the bone marrow, which plays a role in fluoride kinetics. The plasma protein binding of [^{18}F]NaF is negligible. [^{18}F]NaF renal clearance is affected by diet and pH level, due to its re-absorption in the nephron, which is mediated by hydrogen fluoride. However, large differences in urine flow rate are avoided for controlled experiments by keeping patents well hydrated.

The exchangeable pool and the size of the metabolically active surfaces in bones determines the amount of tracer accumulated or exchanged with bone extracellular fluid, chemisorption onto hydroxyapatite crystals to form fluorapatite, as shown in the following equation:

$Ca_{10}(PO_4)_6(OH)_2 + 2F- => Ca_{10}(PO_4)_6F_2 + 2.OH-$

Fluoride ions from the crystalline matrix of bone are released when the bone is remodelled, thus providing a measure of the rate of bone metabolism.

== Use of [^{18}F]NaF in PET imaging and radiation dosimetry ==
In [^{18}F]NaF PET bone imaging, a typical injected activity of 250 MBq delivers an estimated radiation dose of about 4.3 mSv, consistent with international safety standards. Actual dose varies with organ uptake, clearance, and patient anatomy, and additional exposure may result from an accompanying CT scan, depending on scan settings. Lower doses, such as 90 MBq, can provide sufficient image quality in regions like the lumbar spine, and research continues on dose reduction.

== Imaging procedure and patient preparation ==
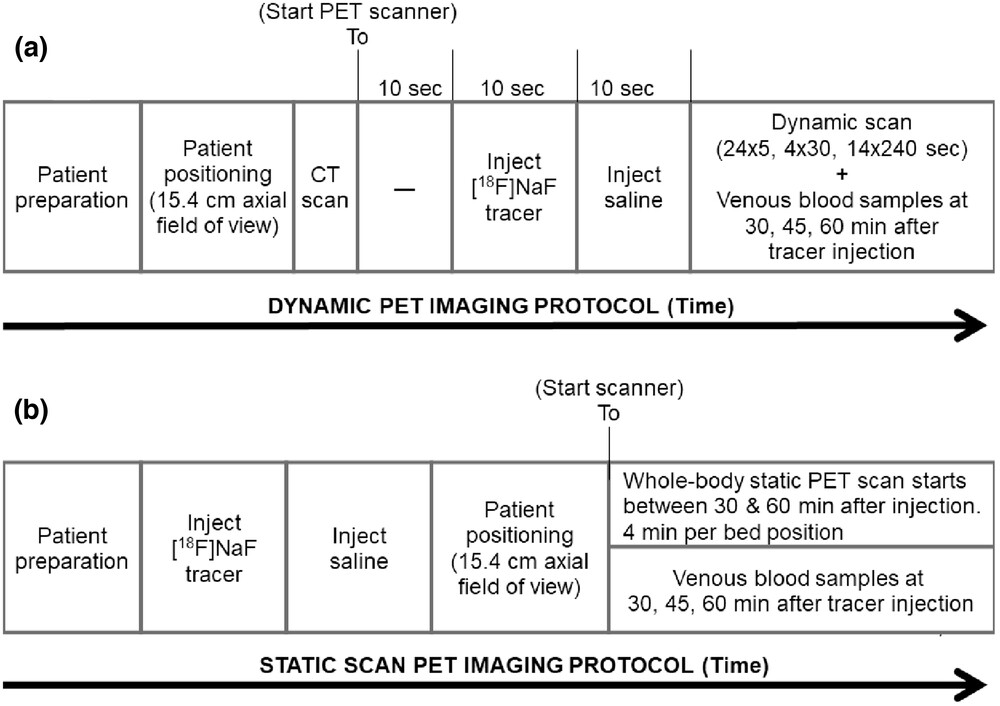
The Bone metabolic flux (Ki) can be measured using either: (a) a 60-min dynamic PET scan, or (b) a static PET scan. The static method captures one bed position in 4 minutes; two positions are used to cover L1–L4. For reliable Ki values, static scans should occur 30–60 minutes post-injection.

Before [^{18}F]NaF PET, patients are advised to stay relaxed and hydrated and to empty their bladder to reduce variability. During imaging, they lie supine with the target region in the scanner field. A CT scan is performed first, followed by intravenous tracer injection and saline flush. Imaging data are collected continuously, and blood samples are taken to measure tracer concentrations in plasma and whole blood. Samples are processed and weighed to calculate volumes, and concentrations over time are used to estimate the arterial input function for kinetic modelling.

== Dose correction and data accuracy ==
To ensure consistent analysis, all tracer concentration values, whether from imaging or blood samples, are corrected to a single reference time point, typically the time of injection. The residual tracer left in the syringe after injection is also measured and adjusted for radioactive decay to calculate the actual amount of tracer delivered to the patient. [^{18}F]NaF does not undergo metabolism or significant protein binding, so the tracer concentration in plasma reflects the parent compound directly. This simplifies the calculation of tracer kinetics.

== Image reconstruction and quantification ==
The PET data are processed using various frame duration to accurately capture both the early rapid changes and the later slower changes in tracer distribution. Corrections for physical factors such as scatter, random coincidences, dead time, and attenuation are applied during reconstruction. Quantitative analysis can be performed using either two-dimensional (2D) or three-dimensional (3D) image reconstruction methods. Each has strengths and limitations. 3D reconstruction generally provides better visualisation due to higher sensitivity but may introduce variability in measured activity across the field of view. In contrast, 2D reconstruction offers more uniform sensitivity, which may make it more reliable for quantitative analysis. Thus, the choice of reconstruction method can impact the accuracy of tracer uptake measurements.

== Measuring SUV using static PET images ==
=== Definition ===
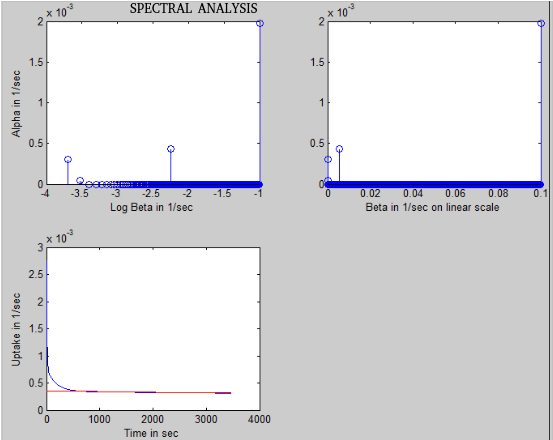
Top row: Spectral analysis output on log (left) and linear (right) scales, showing frequency clusters—high, intermediate, and low—corresponding to plasma, bone ECF, and bone mineral in the Hawkins model. Bottom: IRF plotted using these frequency components.

The standardized uptake value (SUV) is defined as tissue concentration (KBq/ml) divided by activity injected normalized for body weight.

=== Appropriateness ===
The SUV measured from the large ROI smooths out the noise and, therefore, more appropriate in [^{18}F]NaF bone studies as the radiotracer is fairly uniformly taken up throughout the bone. The measurement of SUV is easy, cheap, and quicker to perform, making it more attractive for clinical use. It has been used in diagnosing and assessing the efficacy of therapy. SUV can be measured at a single site, or the whole skeleton using a series of static scans and restricted by the small field-of-view of the PET scanner.

=== Known Issues ===
The SUV has emerged as a clinically useful, albeit controversial, semi-quantitative tool in PET analysis. Standardizing imaging protocols and measuring the SUV at the same time post-injection of the radiotracer, is necessary to obtain a correct SUV because imaging before the uptake plateau introduces unpredictable errors of up to 50% with SUVs. Noise, image resolution, and reconstruction do affect the accuracy of SUVs, but correction with phantom can minimize these differences when comparing SUVs for multi-centre clinical trials. SUV may lack sensitivity in measuring response to treatment as it is a simple measure of tracer uptake in bone, which is affected by the tracer uptake in other competing tissues and organs in addition to the target ROI.

== Measuring K_{i} using serial/dynamic PET images ==
The quantification of dynamic PET studies to measure Ki requires the measurement of the skeletal time-activity curves (TAC) from the region of interest (ROI) and the arterial input function (AIF), which can be measured in various different ways. However, the most common is to correct the image-based blood time-activity curves using several venous blood samples taken at discrete time points while the patient is scanned. The calculation of rate constants or K_{i} requires three steps:

- Measurement of the arterial input function (AIF), which acts as the first input to the mathematical model of tracer distribution.
- Measurement of the time-activity curve (TAC) within the skeletal region of interest, which acts as the second input to the mathematical model of tracer distribution.
- Kinetic modelling of AIF and TAC using mathematical modelling to obtain net plasma clearance (K_{i}) to the bone mineral.

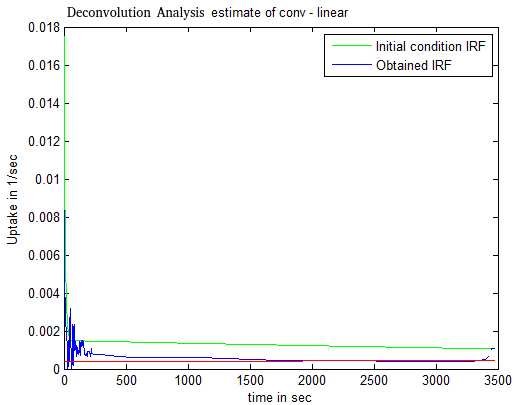
A bone TAC is modeled as the convolution of the arterial input function with the IRF. IRF estimates are iteratively refined to minimize differences between the measured bone curve and the convolution. The green curve shows the initial IRF estimate; the blue curve is the final optimized IRF. Ki is derived from the intercept of the linear fit to the slow exponential component, where the red line crosses the y-axis, representing plasma clearance to bone mineral.

=== Spectral method ===
The method was first described by Cunningham & Jones in 1993 for the analysis of dynamic PET data obtained in the brain. It assumes that the tissue impulse response function (IRF) can be described as a combination of many exponentials. Since A tissue TAC can be expressed as a convolution of measured arterial input function with IRF, C_{bone}(t) can be expressed as:

$C_{bone}(t) = \sum_{k=1}^n \alpha_i . \bigl ( C_{plasma}(t) \otimes exp(-\beta_i . t) \bigr)$

where, $\otimes$ is a convolution operator, C_{bone}(t) is the bone tissue activity concentration of tracer (in units: MBq/ml) over a period of time t, C_{plasma}(t) is the plasma concentration of tracer (in units: MBq/ml) over a period of time t, IRF(t) is equal to the sum of exponentials, β values are fixed between 0.0001 sec^{−1} and 0.1 sec^{−1} in intervals of 0.0001, n is the number of α components that resulted from the analysis and β_{1}, β_{2},..., β_{n} corresponds to the respective α_{1}, α_{2},..., α_{n} components from the resulted spectrum. The values of α are then estimated from the analysis by fitting multi-exponential to the IRF. The intercept of the linear fit to the slow component of this exponential curve is considered the plasma clearance (K_{i}) to the bone mineral.

=== Deconvolution method ===
The method was first described by Williams et al. in the clinical context. The method was used by numerous other studies. This is perhaps the simplest of all the mathematical methods for the calculation of K_{i} but the one most sensitive to noise present in the data. A tissue TAC is modelled as a convolution of measured arterial input function with IRF, the estimates for IRF are obtained iteratively to minimise the differences between the left- and right-hand side of the following Equation:

$C_{bone}(t) = C_{plasma}(t) \otimes IRF(t)$

where, $\otimes$ is a convolution operator, C_{bone}(t) is the bone tissue activity concentration of tracer (in units: MBq/ml) over a period of time t, C_{plasma}(t) is the plasma concentration of tracer (in units: MBq/ml) over a period of time t, and IRF(t) is the impulse response of the system (i.e., a tissue in this case). The K_{i} is obtained from the IRF in a similar fashion to that obtained for the spectral analysis, as shown in the figure.

=== Hawkins model ===
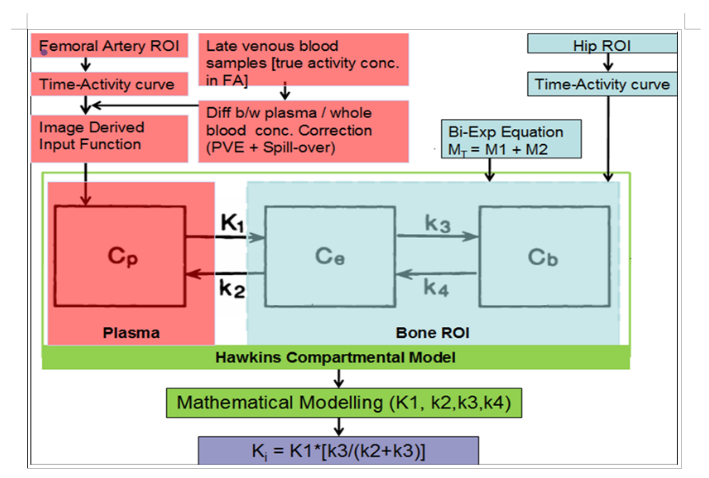
A diagrammatic view of the process of kinetic modelling using Hawkins model used to calculate the rate of bone metabolism at a skeletal site. C_{p} refers to the plasma concentration of the tracer, C_{e} refers to the tracer concentration in ECF compartment, C_{b} refers to the concentration of tracer in bone mineral compartment, M1 refers to mass of tracer in the C_{e} compartment, M2 refers to the mass of tracer in the C_{b} compartment, C_{T} is the total mass in the C_{e}+C_{b}, PVE refers to the partial volume correction, FA refers to the femoral artery, ROI refers to region of the interest, B-Exp refers to the bi-exponential, .

The measurement of Ki from dynamic PET scans require tracer kinetic modelling to obtain the model parameters describing the biological processes in bone, as described by Hawkins et al. Since this model has two tissue compartments, it is sometimes called a two-tissue compartmental model. Various different versions of this model exist; however, the most fundamental approach is considered here with two tissue compartments and four tracer-exchange parameters. The whole kinetic modelling process using Hawkins model can be summed up in a single image as seen on the right-hand-side. The following differential equations are solved to obtain the rate constants:

${\operatorname{d}\! C_{e}(t) \over\operatorname{d}\! t } = K_1* C_p(t) - (k_2+k_3)*C_e(t) + k_4*C_b(t)$

${\operatorname{d}\! C_{b}(t) \over\operatorname{d}\! t } = k_3*C_e(t) - k_4*C_b(t)$

The rate constant K_{1} (in units: ml/min/ml) describes the unidirectional clearance of fluoride from plasma to the whole of the bone tissue, k_{2} (in units: min^{−1}) describes the reverse transport of fluoride from the ECF compartment to plasma, k_{3} and k_{4} (in units min^{−1}) describe the forward and backward transportation of fluoride from the bone mineral compartment.

K_{i} represents the net plasma clearance to bone mineral only. K_{i} is a function of both K_{1}, reflecting bone blood flow, and the fraction of the tracer that undergoes specific binding to the bone mineral k_{3} / (k_{2} + k_{3}). Therefore, $K_i = \left ( \frac{K_1 * k_3}{k_2 + k_3} \right )$

Hawkins et al. found that the inclusion of an additional parameter called fractional blood volume (BV), representing the vascular tissue spaces within the ROI, improved the data fitting problem, although this improvement was not statistically significant.

=== Patlak method ===
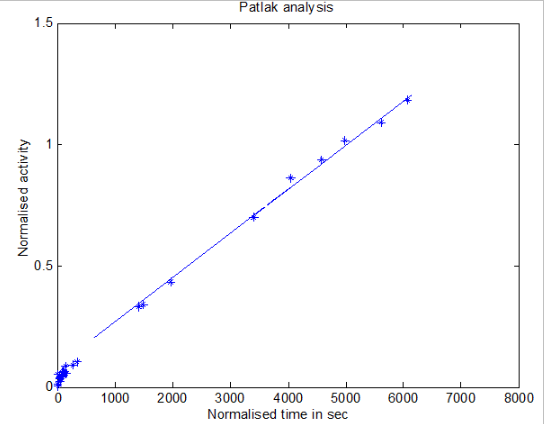
Patlak analysis where a linear regression is fitted between the data on y- and x-axis to obtain the estimates of the Ki, which is the slope of the fitted regression line.

Patlak method is based on the assumption that the backflow of tracer from bone mineral to bone ECF is zero (i.e., k_{4}=0). The calculation of K_{i} using Patlak method is simpler than using non-linear regression (NLR) fitting the arterial input function and the tissue time-activity curve data to the Hawkins model. The Patlak method can only measure bone plasma clearance (K_{i}), and cannot measure the individual kinetic parameters, K_{1}, k_{2}, k_{3}, or k_{4}.

The concentration of tracer in tissue region-of-interest can be represented as a sum of concentration in bone ECF and the bone mineral. It can be mathematically represented as

$\frac{C_{bone}(T)}{C_{plasma}(T)} = K_i * \frac{\int\limits_{0}^{T} C_{plasma}(t) dt}{C_{plasma}(T)} + V_o$

where, within the tissue region-of-interest from the PET image, C_{bone}(T) is the bone tissue activity concentration of tracer (in units: MBq/ml) at any time T, C_{plasma}(T) is the plasma concentration of tracer (in units: MBq/ml) at time T, V_{o} is the fraction of the ROI occupied by the ECF compartment, and $\int\limits_{0}^{T} C_{plasma}(t) dt$ is the area under the plasma curve is the net tracer delivery to the tissue region of interest (in units: MBq.Sec/ml) over time T. The Patlak equation is a linear equation of the form $Y = m*X + c$

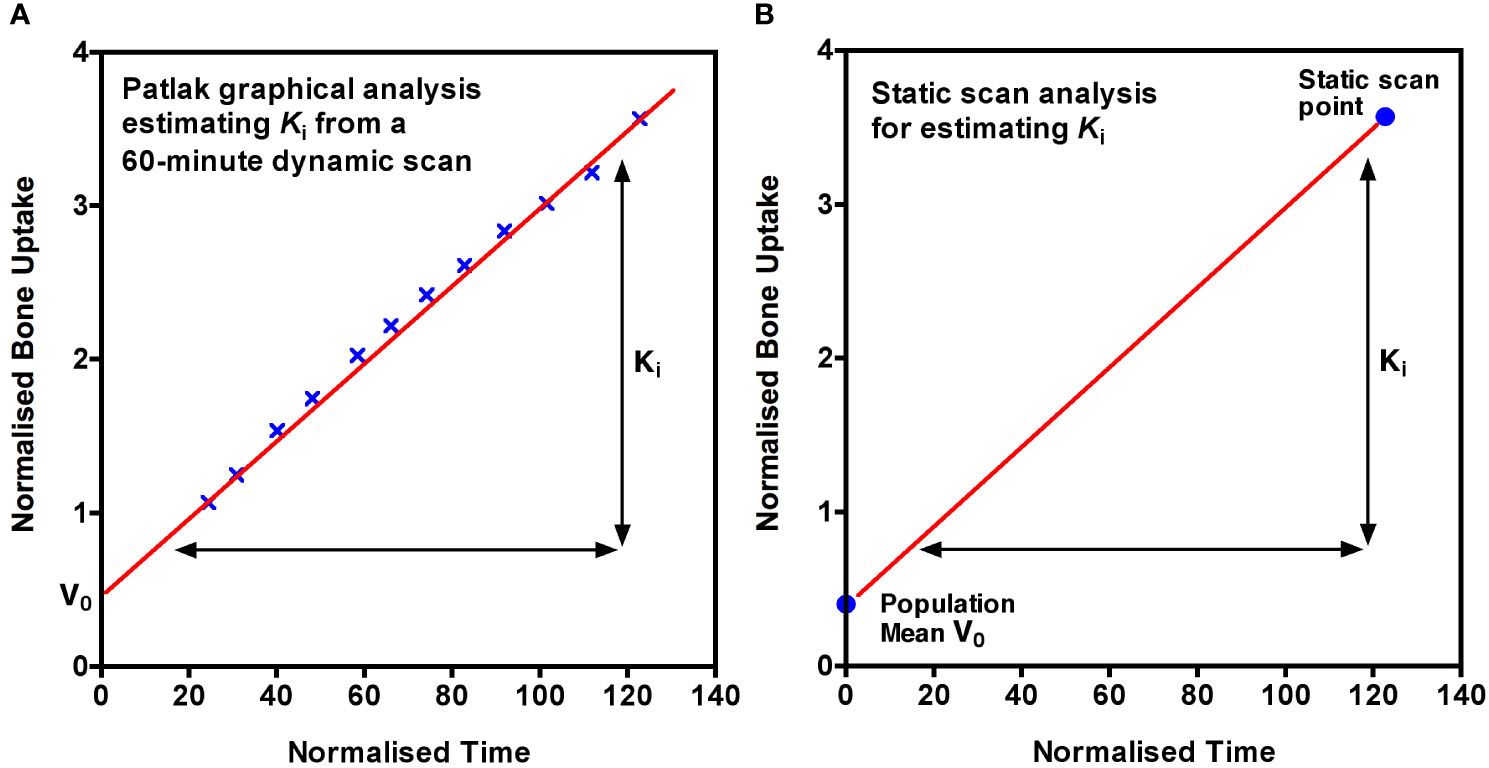
The Patlak plot method for estimating Ki involves plotting normalized bone tracer uptake against normalized time, using data collected between 10 and 60 minutes after tracer injection. A straight line is fitted to the data, where the slope represents Ki, and the intercept (V_{0}) corresponds to the volume of distribution of the tracer within the bone extracellular fluid (ECF) compartment. (B) Siddique-Blake Method: It is a simplified version of the Patlak method, using a single data point typically taken around 60 minutes post-injection. The intercept (V_{0}) is a population-average value.

Therefore, linear regression is fitted to the data plotted on Y- and X-axis between 4–60 minutes to obtain m and c values, where m is the slope of the regression line representing K_{i} and c is the Y-intercept of the regression line representing V_{o}.

=== Siddique–Blake method ===
The calculation of Ki using arterial input function, time-activity curve, and Hawkins model was limited to a small skeletal region covered by the narrow field-of-view of the PET scanner while acquiring a dynamic scan. However, Siddique et al. showed that it was possible to measure K_{i} values in bones using a 4-minute static [^{18}F]NaF PET scans obtained at a single bed position. Blake et al. later showed that the K_{i} obtained using the Siddique–Blake method has precision errors of less than 10%. The Siddique–Blake approach is based on the combination of the Patlak method, the semi-population based arterial input function, and the information that V_{o} does not significantly change post-treatment. This method uses the information that a linear regression line can be plotted using the data from a minimum of two time-points, to obtain m and c as explained in the Patlak method. However, if V_{o} is known or fixed, only one single static PET image is required to obtain the second time-point to measure m, representing the K_{i} value. This method should be applied with great caution to other clinical areas where these assumptions may not hold true. This method has potential for clinical translation due to its simplicity. The Siddique-Blake method requires data to be collected using a specific protocol, allowing an Excel file to be used to calculate the Ki value at any skeletal region within the PET image.

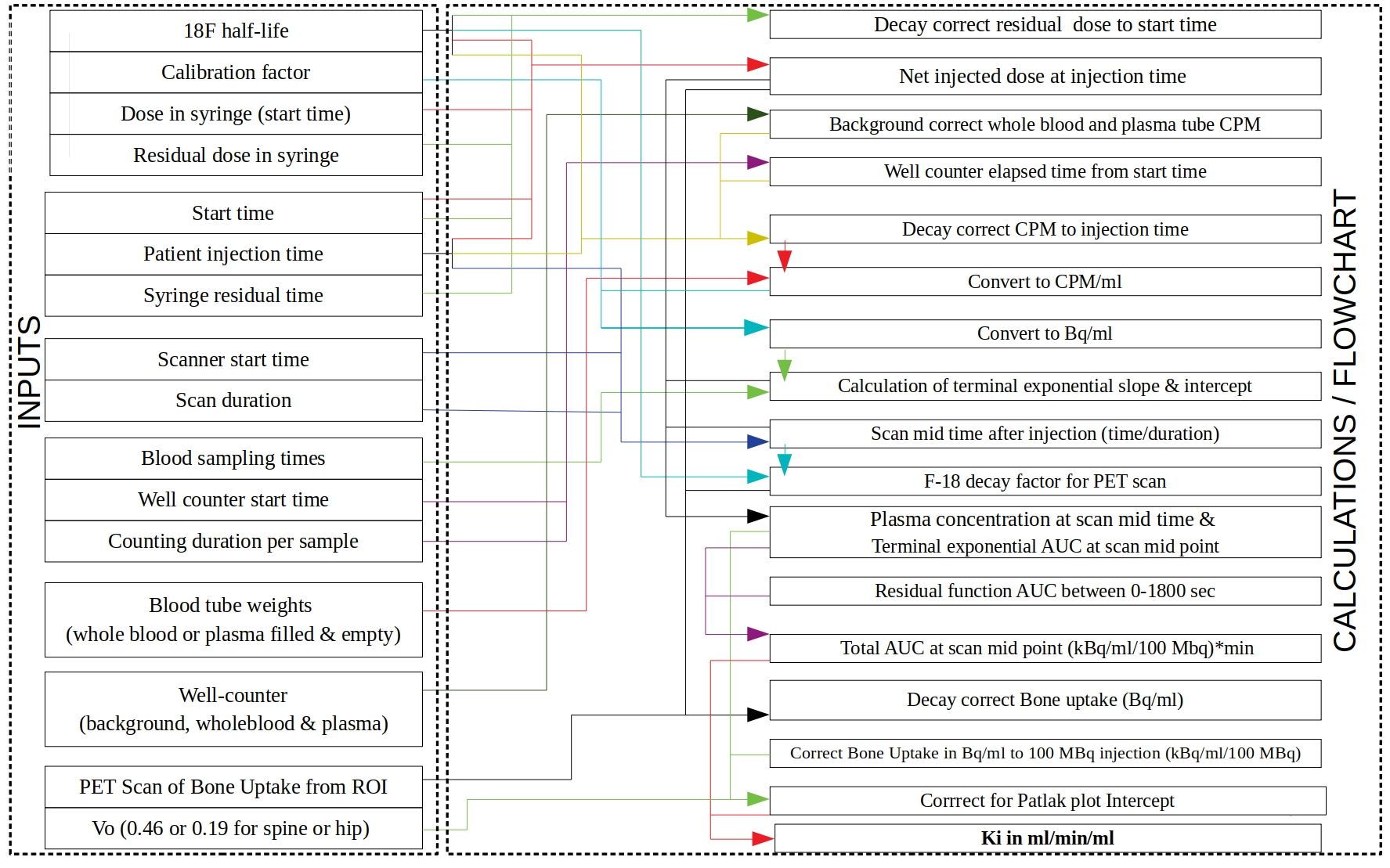
A visual overview of the Excel spreadsheet illustrates how values of [18F] NaF bone metabolic flux (Ki) are calculated using 4-min static PET scan.

The blood sampling protocol worksheet, the Excel file required to perform these calculations, and instructions on how to use the Excel file can be downloaded from the Supplemental Section of this paper by Puri et al.

== SUV vs K_{i} ==
The most fundamental difference between SUV and K_{i} values is that SUV is a simple measure of uptake, which is normalized to body weight and injected activity. The SUV does not take into consideration the tracer delivery to the local region of interest from where the measurements are obtained, therefore, affected by the physiological process consuming [^{18}F]NaF elsewhere in the body. On the other hand, K_{i} measures the plasma clearance to bone mineral, taking into account the tracer uptake elsewhere in the body affecting the delivery of tracer to the region of interest from where the measurements are obtained. The difference in the measurement of K_{i} and SUV in bone tissue using [^{18}F]NaF are explained in more detail by Blake et al.

It is critical to note that most of the methods for calculating K_{i} require dynamic PET scanning over an hour, except, the Siddique–Blake methods. Dynamic scanning is complicated and costly. However, the calculation of SUV requires a single static PET scan performed approximately 45–60 minutes post-tracer injection at any region imaged within the skeleton.

Many researchers have shown a high correlation between SUV and K_{i} values at various skeletal sites. However, SUV and K_{i} methods can contradict for measuring response to treatment. Since SUV has not been validated against the histomorphometry, its usefulness in bone studies measuring response to treatment and disease progression is uncertain.

An additional advantage of using the metabolic flux parameter Ki from dynamic PET imaging, rather than relying solely on standardized uptake values (SUV) from static scans, is its greater sensitivity to treatment-related changes in bone turnover. In one study, postmenopausal women with low bone mineral density at the spine or hip were treated for six months with teriparatide, a parathyroid hormone analog that stimulates bone formation. Tracer uptake in the lumbar spine was assessed both before and after treatment using two approaches: a kinetic modeling method to derive Ki, and static PET imaging to calculate SUV. The average increase in Ki was 23.8%, compared to only a 3.0% increase in SUV. This discrepancy was attributed to a decrease in plasma tracer concentration following treatment, as a greater proportion of the tracer was absorbed by cortical bone in the peripheral skeleton. Since SUV does not account for changes in tracer input function, Ki provides a more reliable measure of treatment response in such contexts. A follow-up study using similar methods found that treatment effects varied by skeletal site: after 12 weeks of teriparatide, Ki increased by 50.7% at the femoral shaft and 17.8% at the lumbar spine. These imaging results were consistent with changes observed in biochemical markers of bone turnover, which also indicated a peak treatment response around 12 weeks. As a result, it is generally recommended to perform PET imaging assessments of therapeutic efficacy no earlier than 12 weeks after initiating bone-forming treatments.

== Interpreting Hawkin's model parameters ==
=== Ki (bone metabolic flux) ===
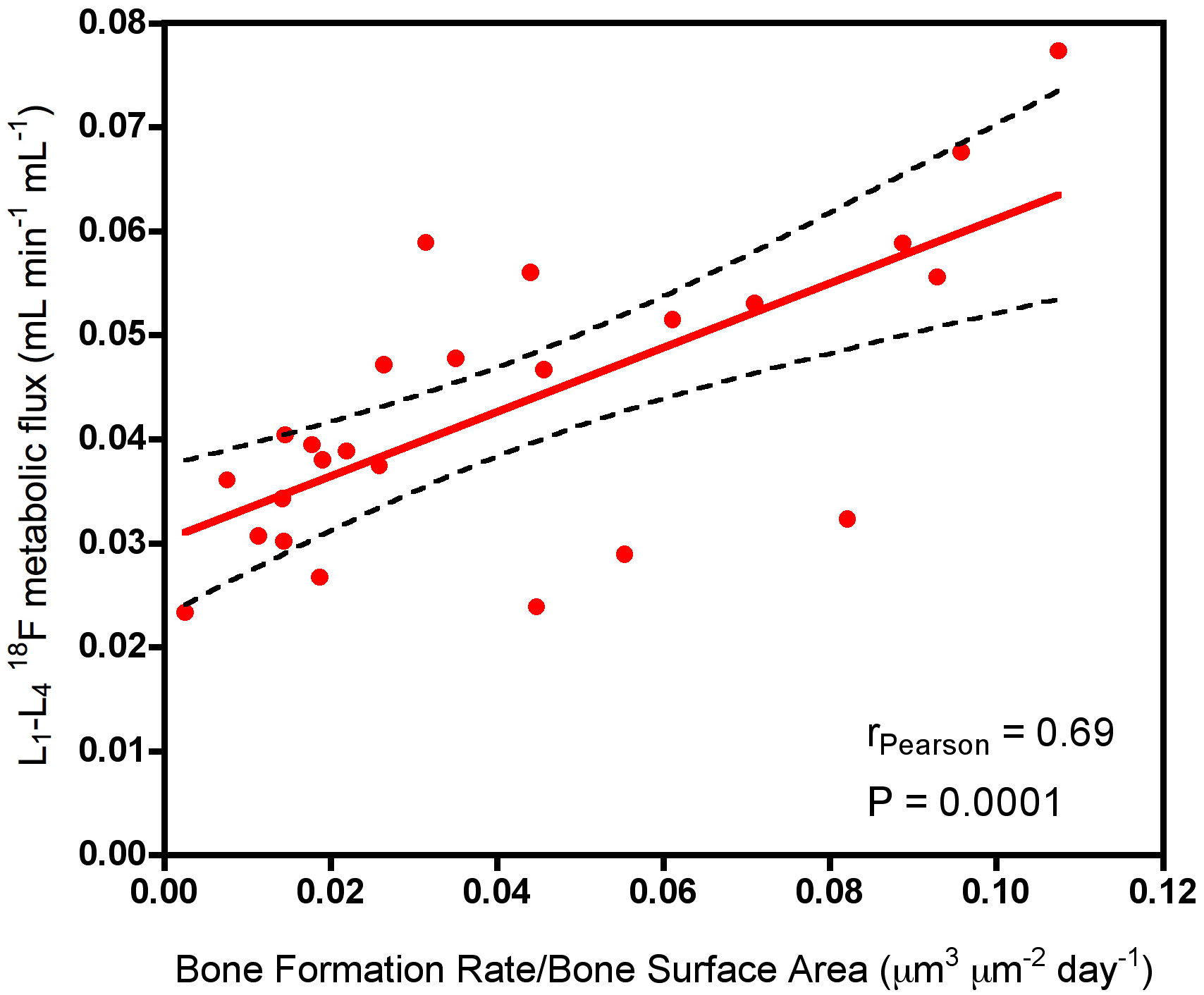
A scatter plot illustrating the relationship between Ki values at the lumbar spine, obtained from [18F]NaF PET imaging and histomorphometry - the bone formation rate per unit bone surface area, determined through tetracycline-labeled bone biopsy at the iliac crest.

In [18F]sodium fluoride PET studies, Ki represents the net rate at which the tracer moves from the bloodstream into the bone mineral compartment. It is commonly used as an indicator of bone turnover, reflecting how efficiently fluoride is taken up and incorporated into bone. Mathematically, Ki is defined by the equation: Ki = K_{1} * k_{3} / (k_{2} + k_{3}), where K_{1} is the rate of delivery of the tracer from plasma to bone, k_{2} represents the rate at which the tracer returns from bone to plasma, and k_{3} corresponds to the rate of tracer binding to bone mineral. Together, these terms represent the fraction of delivered tracer that becomes fixed in the matrix and thus reflect local skeletal metabolic activity. Ki is usually reported in mL/min/mL, meaning the volume of plasma cleared of tracer per minute per millilitre of bone. A value of 0.01 mL/min/mL indicates that each millilitre of bone incorporates tracer at a rate equal to that contained in 0.01 mL of plasma per minute. Ki therefore provides a direct measure of tracer deposition relative to circulating tracer availability, with higher values indicating greater metabolic activity. Compared with SUV, Ki is less affected by systemic changes in tracer distribution or plasma levels and is therefore more reliable for assessing dynamic changes in bone turnover, especially during treatment. This is important in conditions or therapies that alter whole-skeleton tracer handling. Clinically, Ki rises with anabolic therapies such as teriparatide and falls with antiresorptive agents like bisphosphonates. Because it reflects site-specific remodelling activity and correlates with histomorphometric bone formation rates, Ki is useful for monitoring treatment response, evaluating bone quality, and assessing metabolic bone disease.

=== K1 (bone blood perfusion) ===
In dynamic [^{18}F]NaF PET, K_{1} measures the transfer of tracer from plasma into the bone extracellular fluid, serving as an indicator of local bone blood flow. It is expressed in mL/min/mL, representing the volume of plasma cleared of tracer per minute per millilitre of bone. K_{1} is useful for assessing regional bone perfusion, which influences bone metabolism and remodelling. The relationship between K_{1} and actual blood flow is defined by the equation : K_{1} = E * F * (1 − PVC), where E is the extraction efficiency of the tracer during a single capillary pass, F is the local blood flow, and PVC represents the plasma volume correction accounting for red blood cell volume. The extraction efficiency E itself is derived from the formula: E = 1 − exp(−P * S/F), where P denotes capillary permeability to the tracer, S is the surface area of the capillary bed, and F is again the blood flow. In bone, fluoride has a high extraction efficiency due to its small molecular size and ability to rapidly diffuse into surrounding tissues, allowing K_{1} to closely approximate actual blood flow in low-flow conditions. Studies show that K_{1} values below about 0.16 mL/min/mL agree well with bone blood flow measured by [^{15}O]H_{2}O PET. At higher flows, fluoride diffusivity limits equilibration, leading to underestimation of true perfusion. Even so, K_{1} values at metabolically active sites such as the lumbar spine usually fall within this reliable range in both healthy and diseased bone, supporting its use as a perfusion marker. K_{1} is physiologically relevant because bone blood flow is closely tied to remodelling. Adequate perfusion supports osteoblast and osteoclast activity and maintains nutrient delivery and waste removal. Age-related declines in bone blood flow contribute to bone loss, especially in trabecular regions. K_{1} has been linked to calcium uptake and new bone formation in osteoporosis, and reduced vascular regulation has been proposed as a contributor to age-related reductions in flow. Regional variations in K_{1} help explain site-specific metabolic differences: the spine generally shows higher values than the proximal femur or humerus, consistent with its greater metabolic activity and red-marrow content. Peripheral bones tend to show lower K_{1}, partly due to age-related increases in fatty marrow. These patterns highlight the importance of vascular supply in bone health and support the use of K_{1} as an indicator of regional bone perfusion and metabolism.

=== k2 & k3 ===
In dynamic [^{18}F]NaF PET, k_{2} and k_{3} describe tracer exchange between the extravascular extracellular fluid and bone. k_{2} represents efflux from the fluid space back to plasma, while k_{3} reflects tracer binding to the bone mineral matrix. Although their physiological meaning is not fully defined, both describe how efficiently fluoride is extracted and incorporated into bone. These parameters are part of the standard compartmental model used to calculate Ki (Ki = K_{1} * k_{3} / (k_{2} + k_{3})), making them important for understanding tracer retention, especially in metabolic bone disorders and during treatment. Antiresorptive therapy, such as bisphosphonates, has been associated with higher k_{2}, consistent with reduced tracer retention. High-turnover diseases like Paget's disease show elevated k_{3} and reduced k_{2}, reflecting increased mineralizing surfaces, expanded extracellular space, and slower tracer return to plasma. Changes in bone structure also influence these rates. Altered marrow composition or fibrosis can reduce extracellular fluid volume and permeability, affecting tracer availability. Because k_{2} measures how rapidly tracer leaves the fluid space and k_{3} how effectively it binds to mineral, their balance shows how tracer is divided between transient residence and permanent incorporation. Together, k_{2} and k_{3} provide insight into local bone microenvironment, including perfusion, remodelling, and mineralization. They vary with disease and therapy and complement K_{1} and Ki in interpreting dynamic PET of bone metabolism

=== k4 ===
The k_{4} is the backward rate constant describing movement of [^{18}F]fluoride from the bone mineral compartment back into the extracellular fluid. It reflects the reversible component of fluoride binding to hydroxyapatite. Non-zero k_{4} values reported in multiple studies show that a portion of tracer can dissociate from mineral surfaces. Typical values are low (~0.01 1/min), corresponding to a bone-mineral residence half-life of about 70 minutes. Because k_{4} is small, methods such as the Patlak plot often assume k_{4} = 0. This simplifies analysis but can underestimate Ki by up to roughly 25%, since Ki depends on net tracer influx and ignoring reversibility biases the estimate. Available data suggest that k_{4} varies little between regions such as the spine and hip. Model-wise, k_{4} helps differentiate tracer that is firmly bound from tracer that remains exchangeable, clarifying the balance between deposition and release at mineral surfaces. Including k_{4} in compartmental models improves the physiological accuracy of Ki and enhances interpretation of bone metabolism in dynamic PET studies.

=== K1/k2 (effective volume of tracer distribution in bone ECF) ===
The K_{1}/k_{2} ratio represents the effective volume of distribution of tracer in the bone extracellular fluid (ECF), assuming passive fluoride diffusion between plasma and ECF. Fluoride ions can form neutral HF, allowing them to diffuse across cell membranes. Exchange within the ECF may be limited by binding in marrow spaces. Empirical data indicate K_{1}/k_{2} corresponds to roughly 48% of vertebral bone volume and 34% of humeral bone volume, consistent with prior estimates of ECF in trabecular and marrow compartments. Trabecular bone, with more marrow, has a larger ECF than cortical bone. Ki values are generally about three times lower at the hip than the lumbar spine. This partly reflects marrow composition: red-marrow-rich vertebrae have higher K_{1}/k_{2} and greater ECF volume, while fatty-marrow-dominated hip has lower tracer availability. Therapeutically, lumbar K_{1}/k_{2} decreases after antiresorptive treatment, reflecting reduced ECF from increased bone density. In Paget's disease, K_{1}/k_{2} is elevated, reflecting expansion of bone and non-bone ECF and contributing to higher sodium fluoride uptake.

=== Proportion of tracer undergoing specific mineral incorporation ===
The k_{3} / (k_{2} + k_{3}) ratio represents the fraction of tracer delivered to the bone extracellular fluid that binds to the bone mineral matrix. It is mathematically equivalent to Ki/K_{1} and reflects the proportion of tracer undergoing specific mineral incorporation. Values are similar between lumbar spine and hip in healthy postmenopausal adults. This ratio has been used to monitor treatment response in metabolic bone diseases. Anabolic therapies, such as teriparatide, increase k_{3} / (k_{2} + k_{3}), indicating enhanced mineral binding, whereas antiresorptive agents, like risedronate, decrease it. Compared with other kinetic parameters, it is highly sensitive to treatment-related changes and serves as a surrogate for bone formation rate. Due to its specificity for mineral-bound tracer, robustness, and correlation with clinical outcomes, k_{3} / (k_{2} + k_{3}) is a valuable parameter for assessing skeletal metabolic activity with dynamic [^{18}F]NaF PET in both clinical and research settings.

== Measuring response to treatment using [^{18}F]NaF PET ==
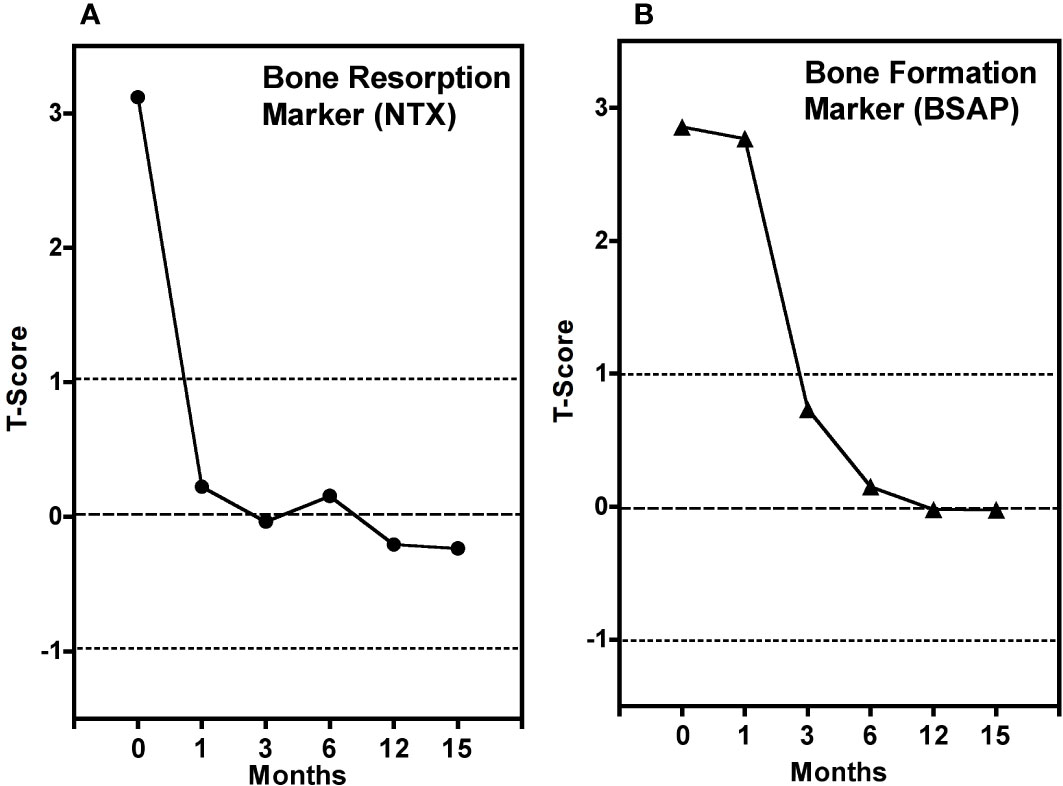
Average T-scores of biochemical markers for (A) bone resorption (NTX) and (B) bone formation (BSAP) measured at six time points in 85 postmenopausal women treated with alendronic acid. Scores are referenced to 46 healthy premenopausal controls, where T-score = 0.

Monitoring treatment response in bone diseases requires methods that detect changes rapidly and accurately. Biochemical markers in blood and urine provide one approach, distinguishing between bone resorption and formation. Common resorption markers include serum carboxy-terminal collagen crosslinks and N-terminal telopeptide, while formation markers include bone-specific alkaline phosphatase and procollagen 1 N-terminal propeptide. Resorption markers typically decline within a month of antiresorptive therapy, whereas formation markers change more slowly, usually after 3–6 months. [^{18}F]NaF PET offers an imaging-based method for assessing treatment effects. In postmenopausal women treated with risedronate, Ki and k_{3}/(k_{2} + k_{3}) decreased by about 18% after six months, while k_{2} increased. Teriparatide treatment showed opposite effects, with Ki and k_{3}/(k_{2} + k_{3}) rising by roughly 24%. These findings demonstrate that [^{18}F]NaF PET can detect both bone-preserving and bone-building treatment responses.

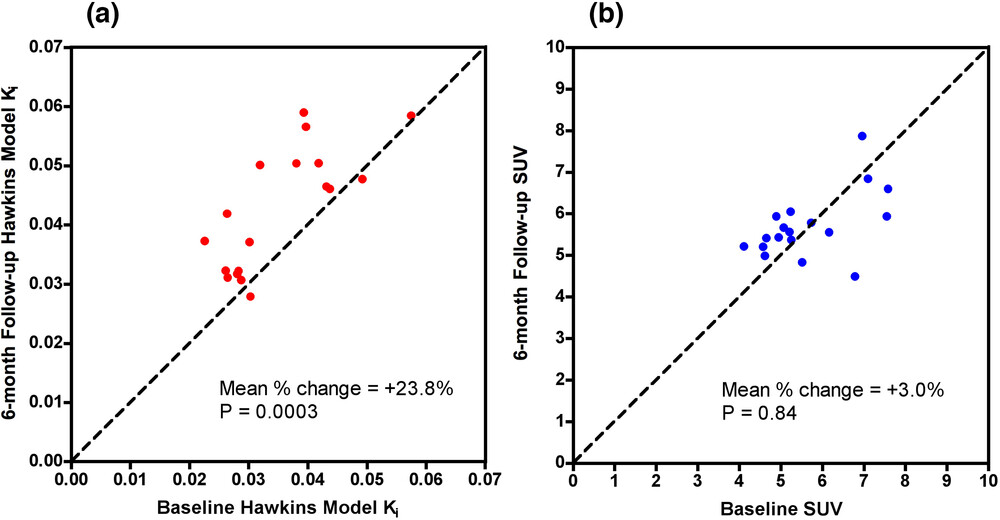
(a) Scatter plot of Hawkins model Ki at the lumbar spine in 18 postmenopausal women before and after 6 months of teriparatide treatment, showing a 23.8% average increase. (b) Similar plot of SUVmean values, with a 3.0% mean increase at follow-up.

The timing for measuring treatment response using [^{18}F]NaF PET is particularly advantageous, with quantitative sodium fluoride PET-CT capable of detecting changes in regional bone formation within approximately 12 weeks after treatment initiation. This [^{18}F]NaF PET allows earlier assessment of treatment response than DXA, detecting changes within three months and enabling timely clinical decisions. Ki measurements have been shown to be more sensitive than standardized uptake values (SUV). For example, Ki detected significant changes in the spine with teriparatide, whereas SUV remained unchanged at the same site but increased at the hip. This demonstrates that Ki provides a more accurate measure of local bone metabolism, particularly when tracer is distributed across multiple active skeletal sites, making SUV less reliable for regional changes.

== Accuracy of model parameters in [^{18}F]NaF PET ==
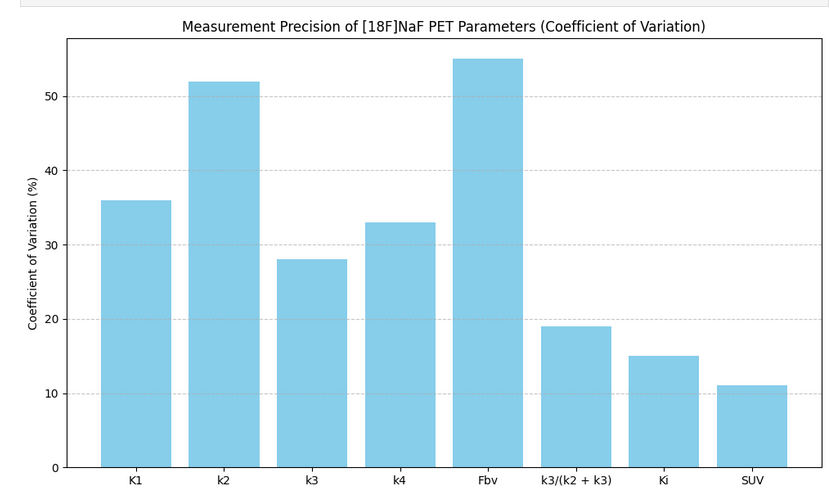
Plotted [18F]NaF PET Coefficient of Variation (CoV) data based on info available in Puri, T.; Frost, M.L.; Cook, G.J.; Blake, G.M. [18F] Sodium Fluoride PET Kinetic Parameters in Bone Imaging. Tomography 2021, 7, 843-854. https://doi.org/10.3390/tomography7040071, published under 2021 by the authors. Licensee MDPI, Basel, Switzerland. This article is an open access article distributed under the terms and conditions of the Creative Commons Attribution (CC BY) license (https://creativecommons.org/licenses/by/4.0/).

In the Hawkins model, measurement precision and treatment response determine the reliability of kinetic parameters. Parameters with high therapeutic response and low variability require fewer participants to detect significant changes. In a teriparatide study, only Ki and k_{3}/(k_{2} + k_{3}) demonstrated sufficient reliability and sensitivity to treatment. Other parameters (K_{1}, k_{2}, k_{3}, k_{4}, and Fbv) had measurement errors around 30% or higher, limiting their usefulness in research. The measurement precision data reveals significant variability across different parameters. K1 demonstrated a coefficient of variation of 36%, while k2 showed the poorest precision at 52%. Parameter k3 exhibited 28% variation, k4 showed 33%, and Fbv displayed 55% coefficient of variation. In contrast, the k3/(k2 + k3) ratio achieved much better precision at 19%, and Ki demonstrated the best measurement reliability with only 15% coefficient of variation. For comparison, standardized uptake value measurements showed 11% coefficient of variation. Ki and k_{3}/(k_{2} + k_{3}) are the most practical parameters for clinical monitoring due to their high measurement precision and clear response to treatment. Other parameters show greater variability, limiting their usefulness despite physiological relevance. This emphasizes the need to balance theoretical significance with measurement reliability in clinical studies of bone metabolism.

== Clinical applications of [^{18}F]NaF PET ==
=== 1. Metabolic Bone Disorders ===
- Osteoporosis: [^{18}F]NaF PET has demonstrated utility in evaluating treatment efficacy in osteoporosis by quantifying regional bone turnover. Frost et al. (2013) showed that it provides sensitive detection of treatment response to bone-active agents, especially at the hip, offering a noninvasive biomarker for monitoring therapeutic impact.
- Paget's Disease: In Paget's disease, [^{18}F]NaF PET is effective for assessing disease activity and monitoring response to therapy. Installé et al. (2005) found that fluoride uptake patterns correlate with disease extent and therapeutic changes, making it a reliable imaging tool for disease management.

=== 2. Chronic Kidney Disease–Mineral and Bone Disorder (CKD-MBD) ===
- [^{18}F]NaF PET provides insight into altered bone metabolism in CKD-MBD, where standard imaging may fall short. Feng et al. (2021) highlighted its role in evaluating early kinetic changes, enabling noninvasive assessment of skeletal complications in CKD patients.

=== 3. Metastatic Bone Disease ===
- In patients with breast cancer, [^{18}F]NaF PET can assess skeletal metastases with high sensitivity. Azad et al. (2019) showed that measuring fluoride metabolic flux offers superior assessment of treatment response compared to conventional SUV measurements, improving clinical decision-making.

=== 4. Autoimmune Diseases ===
- [^{18}F]NaF PET/CT aids in evaluating disease activity in rheumatoid arthritis by detecting bone remodeling and joint involvement. Park et al. (2021) demonstrated its utility in estimating inflammatory burden and tracking treatment response, particularly when traditional markers are inconclusive.

=== 5. Fracture Healing & Orthopedic Applications ===
- [^{18}F]NaF PET is valuable in assessing fracture healing, including challenging cases like atypical femoral shaft fractures. It helps distinguish between viable and nonviable bone, enabling early detection of impaired healing and guiding orthopedic management.

=== 6. Atherosclerosis ===
- Joshi et al. (2014) demonstrated that [^{18}F]NaF PET can identify active, high-risk coronary plaques that are prone to rupture — outperforming traditional imaging by detecting microcalcification activity.
- Syed et al. (2022) showed that [^{18}F]NaF PET/CT detects disease activity in acute aortic syndromes, providing critical insight into vascular wall remodeling and potential instability in real time.

=== 7. Osteogenic Bone Disorder ===
- Fibrodysplasia Ossificans Progressiva (FOP): [^{18}F]NaF PET/CT can detect early heterotopic ossification in FOP. Eekhoff et al. (2018) found it effective in identifying subclinical disease activity before structural changes appear on conventional imaging.

=== 8. Medication-Related Bone Pathology ===
- Osteonecrosis of the Jaw (ONJ): In patients receiving bisphosphonates or antiresorptive therapies, [^{18}F]NaF PET helps detect osteonecrosis of the jaw early. Raje et al. (2008) showed that it offers valuable metabolic and structural information, aiding in the diagnosis and monitoring of ONJ in cancer patients.

== See also ==
- Bone
- Positron emission tomography
- Time-activity curve
- Arterial input function
- Medical Imaging
- Radiology
- Molecular Imaging
- Medical Imaging
- Bone scintigraphy
