= Cavalry tactics =

Military tactics involving mounted troops

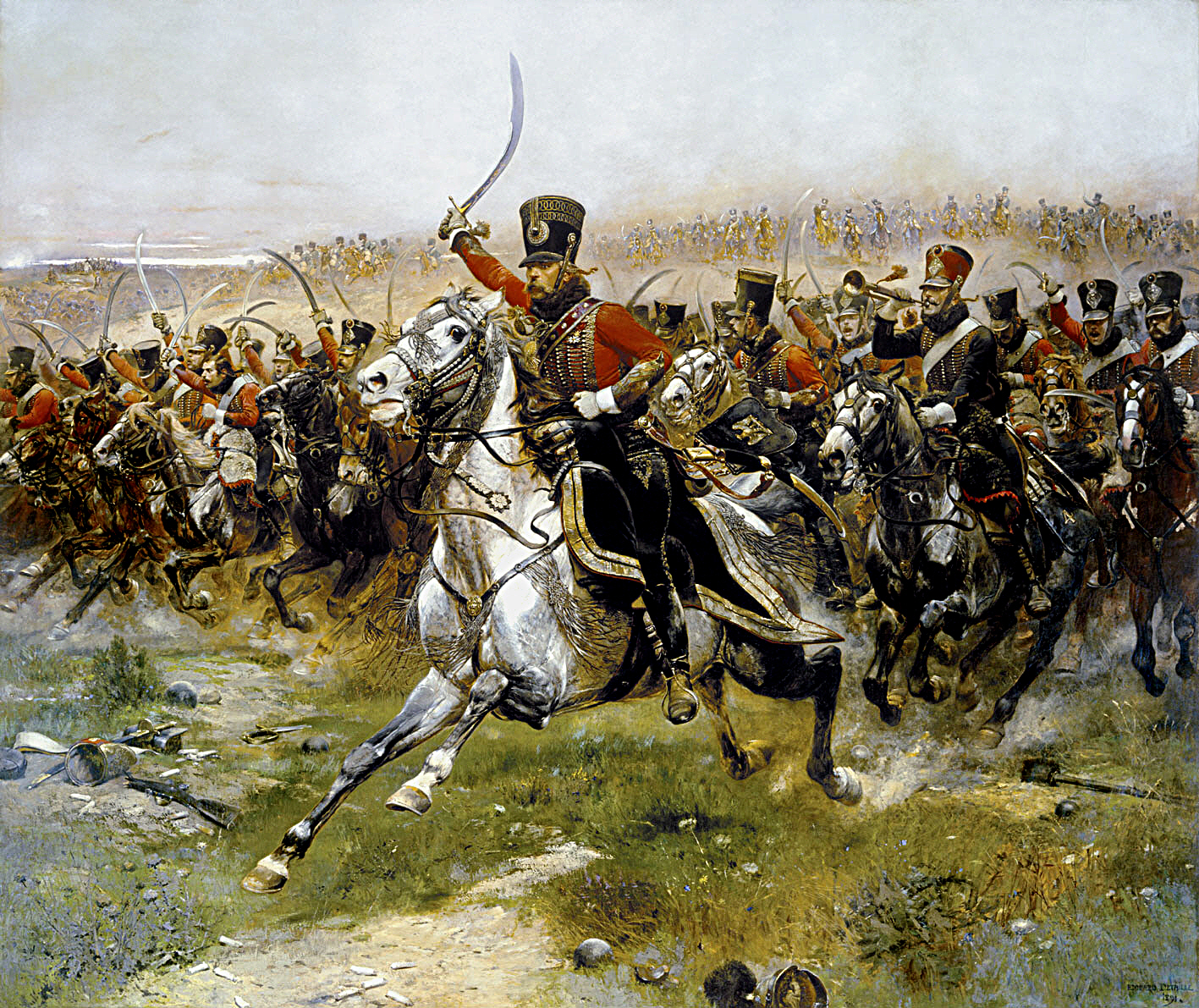
Charge of the French 4th Hussars at the Battle of Friedland, 14 June 1807, during the Napoleonic Wars

Cavalry tactics are the military methods used by mounted forces to conduct reconnaissance, screening, raiding, and shock assaults. Historically executed by soldiers riding horses, camels, or elephants, or fighting from chariots, these roles are performed in modern warfare by units equipped with armored fighting vehicles and helicopters.

== Early mounts and chariots ==
Until selective breeding produced horses large enough to carry an armored rider in close combat, armies deployed chariots both as platforms for archers and to charge enemy formations. Mounted horsemen gradually replaced chariots as selective breeding yielded larger horses and improvements in ltack gave riders greater control and agility over rough terrain. Armies in South Asia, the Near East, and the Mediterranean deployed war elephants to break enemy ranks and carry archers above the battlefield, though panicked animals frequently turned and trampled friendly troops.

== Light cavalry tactics ==
Lightly armored and equipped with missile weapons, Light cavalry depended on speed and stamina rather than shock tactics.

- Skirmishing and mounted archery: Steppe and Near Eastern armies, including those of the Scythians, Parthians, Huns, and Mongols, relied on horse archers operating in small, mobile waves. These units harassed enemy lines with sustained long-range fire before using feigned retreats to draw opponents out of position and envelop their flanks.
- Scouting enemy movements and screening the main army: Light horsemen rode ahead of the main body to reconnoiter the ground, spot enemy movements, and screen the army from rival scouts.
- Disrupting supply lines and harrying the retreat: Light units raided enemy lines of communication and harried retreating forces to prevent them from reforming.

== Heavy cavalry and shock action ==
Heavy cavalry relied on mass and momentum in shock charges to break enemy formations.

- Hammer-and-anvil tactics: Under Philip II and Alexander the Great, Macedonian battle tactics relied on a coordinated hammer-and-anvil approach: heavy infantry phalanxes fixed the opposing line in place, allowing the Companion cavalry to strike exposed flanks or gaps.
- Heavy cavalry shock tactics: Heavy cavalry, including cataphracts, medieval knights, and cuirassiers relied on lances and swords in close formation, riding knee-to-knee or stirrup-to-stirrup, to break wavering infantry or exploit gaps opened by artillery and foot troops.

== Tactical adaptations to firearms ==
Mounted shock tactics succeeded primarily against isolated or disordered foot soldiers; disciplined infantry formations generally held against direct frontal charges.

- Vulnerability to infantry formations and projectile fire: To blunt cavalry charges, well-drilled infantry relied on close-order formations, such as pike walls and infantry squares, alongside defensive stakes and massed missile fire from longbows, crossbows, and early firearms.
- Impact of firearms: As hand-held firearms and artillery became widespread, heavy plate armor fell out of use. Cavalry adapted by carrying pistols and carbines, employing maneuvers like the caracole, where successive ranks rode forward to fire and wheeled back to reload, or by dismounting to fight as dragoons.
- Decline of horse cavalry: During the late 19th and early 20th centuries, the introduction of rifled muskets, breech-loading artillery, barbed wire, and machine guns exposed charging horsemen to unsustainable casualties. Consequently, armies increasingly relegated cavalry to reconnaissance and dismounted firefights.

== Mechanized and airmobile roles ==
In modern armies, armored, mechanized, and aviation units have replaced horse-mounted formations, though they retain traditional cavalry roles such as reconnaissance, screening, economy-of-force operations, and exploitation.
