= Tact =

Tact or TACT may refer to:

- The sense of touch; see Somatosensory system
- Tact (psychology), a type of verbal operant described by B. F. Skinner
- Terrorism Act
- The Actors Company Theatre (TACT)
- Actors' Orphanage, formerly The Actors' Charitable Trust (TACT)
- Tact Meyers, a Galaxy Angel character
- The Adolescent and Children's Trust
- Trial to Assess Chelation Therapy, an evaluation of chelation therapy for cardiovascular disease
- Business acumen
- Etiquette
- Gracefulness
- Prudence
- Tactic (method)

== See also ==
- Tack (disambiguation)
