= Tak Dam =

Tak Dam (Persian: تكدام or تك دام) may refer to:

- Tak Dam, Germi
- Tak Dam, Meshgin Shahr
- Tak Dam-e Barzand

== See also ==
- Təkdam
