= Tack =

Tack may refer to:

== People ==
=== Given name or nickname ===
- Tacks Latimer (1875–1936), American baseball catcher
- Tacks Neuer (1877–1966), American baseball pitcher
- Tack Wilson (born 1955), American baseball outfielder
- Wong Tack (born 1959), Malaysian politician
- Irwin "Tack" Kuntz (fl. 1982–present), American pharmaceutical chemist

=== Surname ===
- François Tack (c. 1650–1686), Dutch East India Company officer
- Augustus Vincent Tack (1870–1949), American painter
- Anita Tack (born 1951), German politician of the Left Party
- Erik Tack (born 1958), Belgian politician
- Kerstin Tack (born 1968), German politician of the Social Democratic Party

=== Fictional characters ===
- Tack, the silent protagonist of the 1993 animated film The Thief and the Cobbler

== Implements, and creative or constructive tasks and materials ==
- Tack (sewing) (also baste or pin), quick, temporary stitching intended to be removed
- Blu Tack, a reusable putty-like pressure-sensitive adhesive used for attaching paper items to walls
- Horse tack, equipment used to allow riding or driving of horses and some other riding animals
- Thumbtack or drawing pin, a short nail or pin easily placed and removed by hand
- Shoe tack, a type of cut nail, used in upholstery, shoe making and saddle manufacture

== Sailing ==
- A tack as a part of the tacking maneuver; in which a sailing boat turns its bow through the wind
- Tack (sailing), the lower corner of a sail's leading edge
- Tack (square sail), a type of rigging unique to square sails

== Other uses ==
- Hardtack, a hard cracker or biscuit used for food on sea voyages and by soldiers during the American Civil War.
- Scottish lease, as held by a tacksman
- Tack, another name for stickiness in chemistry
- The Tack, a parliamentary maneuver supported by Tackers in 1704
- The grand tack hypothesis on the origin of the structure of the Solar System
- "TACK", a proposed archaeal taxon, presumably a sister taxon of hypothetical "Asgard" taxon within the "Proteoarchaeota" kingdom; now renamed to Thermoproteati
- TACK, a proposed network security standard co-created by Moxie Marlinspike
- Any of the four symbols
  - right tack $\vdash$
  - down tack $\top$
  - up tack $\bot$
  - left tack $\dashv$

== See also ==
- TAC (disambiguation)
- Tacking (disambiguation)
- Tact (disambiguation)
- Tak (disambiguation)
