= TAC =

TAC, or tac, may refer to:

== People ==
- Pablo Tac, US scholar
- Pham Cong Tac, a leader of the Cao Dai religion

== Places ==
- Tác, a village in Fejér County, Hungary

== Organisations ==
- TAC (building automation), a Swedish building automation company
- Tactical Air Command, a former command of the US Air Force
- Technical Advisory Council, a committee advising the US FCC
- Technical Assistance Center, a company's internal support group for external customers
- The Aleut Corporation, Alaska, United States, a Native Regional Corporation
- The Analysis Corporation, a private intelligence firm
- The Ant Commandos, a company which produces video game console peripherals
- The Asatru Community, an inclusive Norse Pagan/Heathen sect; see Kindred (Heathenism)
- The Athletics Congress, US sports governing body, became USATF in 1992
- The Architects Collaborative, Cambridge, Massachusetts, US
- Thomas Aquinas College, a college with multiple campuses in the US
- Transport Accident Commission, government auto insurer in Victoria, Australia
- Treatment Action Campaign, a South African AIDS organisation
- Treaty of Amity and Cooperation in Southeast Asia
- Traditional Anglican Communion
- Transatlantic Council, Boy Scouts of America

== Transport ==
- TAC Colombia, a charter airline based in Bogotá, Colombia
- TAC, the IATA code for Daniel Z. Romualdez Airport on Leyte island, Philippines
- TAC, the National Rail code for Tackley railway station in the county of Oxfordshire, UK
- TAC - Transportes Aéreos Catarinense, a former Brazilian airline
- Tecnologia Automotiva Catarinense (TAC) a Brazilian automotive company
- Terminal area chart, an aeronautical chart of the area surrounding a major airport
- Thai Airways Company, a former Thai airline
- Trans Air Congo, a Congolese airline
- Transport Accident Commission, an insurer in Victoria, Australia

== Military and law enforcement ==
- Demro TAC-1, a pistol calibre carbine/submachine gun
- McMillan TAC-50, an American sniper rifle
- Tactical Air Command, a former major command of the United States Air Force
- TAC 30, the official name of a SWAT unit belonging to the King County Sheriff's Office

== Science and technology ==
- Motorola TAC, brand used by Motorola for their early mobile phones (Total Area Coverage)
- TAC, a codon for the amino acid Tyrosine
- TAC, a mixture of tetracaine, adrenaline and cocaine, a liquid sometimes given as a soothing gel to children
- TaC, chemical formula for Tantalum carbide
- tac, a Linux command that concatenates lines in reverse, named by analogy with cat
- TAC (software), an instant messaging and chat client program
- TAC-2, game controller compatible with Atari 2600 video game systems
- Terminal Access Controller, a host computer that accepts terminal connections
- Thermally Advantaged Chassis, an Intel computer specification
- Three-address code, a representation of intermediate code used by compilers
- Time-activity curve, tracer concentration within a region of interest within dynamic image plotted over time
- Triacetyl cellulose, a polymer used in display applications
- Trigeminal autonomic cephalgia, a type of headache that occurs on one side of the head
- Type Allocation Code (TAC), part of a mobile device's IMEI identifying maker and model
- TAC (Total Action Center), codename for the Xbox 2001 console.

== Media ==
- TAC (video game), a 1983 computer game published by Avalon Hill
- Group TAC, a Japanese anime and computer graphics studio
- The Accessible Channel, a Canadian digital television channel
- The American Conservative, a paleoconservative magazine published by the American Ideas Institute

== Other ==
- tac, the ISO 639-3 code for the Tarahumara language spoken in the state of Chihuahua, Mexico
- Terrible-Monster Attacking Crew, a fictional pilot squadron in Ultraman Ace
- The Arts Centre or TAC, former name of Home of the Arts, Gold Coast
- Total allowable catch, in commercial fishing under the European Union's Common Fisheries Policy
- Traffic Acquisition Costs, the costs an online service provider has to get routed traffic from other websites to their service
