= Standardized uptake value =

Term in nuclear medicine

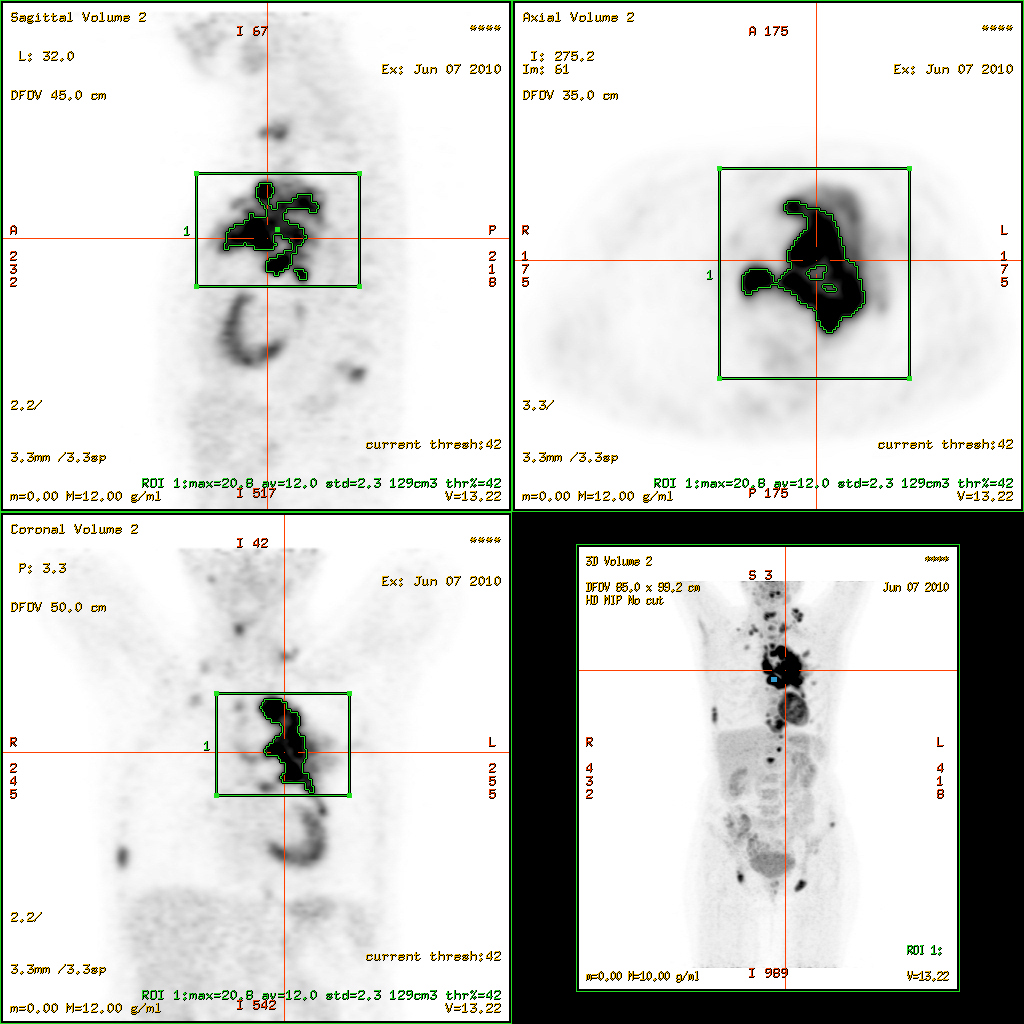
3-dimensional [^{18}F]FDG-PET image with 3D ROI generated by a threshold based algorithm. The blue dot in the MIP image bottom right marks the maximum SUV within the ROI.

The standardized uptake value (SUV) is a nuclear medicine term, used in positron emission tomography (PET) as well as in modern calibrated single-photon emission computed tomography (SPECT) imaging for a semiquantitative analysis. Its use is particularly common in the analysis of [^{18}F]fluorodeoxyglucose ([^{18}F]FDG) images of cancer patients. It can also be used with other PET agents especially when no arterial input function is available for more detailed pharmacokinetic modeling. Otherwise measures like the fractional uptake rate (FUR) or parameters from more advanced pharmacokinetic modeling may be preferable.

Abnormal SUV values indicate variations in metabolic activity and thus can provide identifying areas of interest, like tumors or regions of inflammation.

The SUV is the ratio of the image-derived radioactivity concentration c_{img} and the whole body concentration of the injected radioactivity c_{inj},

$SUV = \frac {c_{img}} {c_{inj}}.$

== Discussion ==
While this equation looks simple, there are a number of points that need to be discussed, such as (1) the origin of c_{img} data, (2) the origin of c_{inj} data, (3) time, and (4) units.

=== Image ===
The c_{img} data may be the pixel intensities of a calibrated PET image. Calculated SUV data can then be visualized as parametric SUV image. Alternatively, groups of such pixels may be selected e.g. by manually drawing or otherwise segmenting a region of interest (ROI) on the PET image. Then e.g. the average intensity of that ROI may be used as c_{img} input to calculate SUV values.

=== Injection ===
The c_{inj} value is calculated as ratio of two independent measurements: the injected radioactivity (injected dose, ID) and the body weight (BW) of the subject. The ID can be estimated e.g. as difference in the radioactivity of the syringe before and after injection, if deemed necessary with correction for physical decay between each of those measurements and the time of injection. Conventionally the time of injection is t=0. This reference concentration represents the hypothetical case of an even distribution of the injected radioactivity across the whole body. Measured SUV values in particular parts of the body thus quantify the deviation from this hypothetical even radioactivity distribution: SUV > 1 indicates radioactivity accumulation in that region above the hypothetical even radioactivity distribution.

=== Time (Physical Decay) ===
The injection of radioactivity is often followed by a waiting time interval and then a time span during which the PET image data are acquired. After image reconstruction, the image c_{img} (t) data need to be decay corrected to the injection time point t=0. The time point t may be the image acquisition start time, or in case of a long acquisition duration e.g. the midpoint of the PET image acquisition may be more appropriate. This decay correction needs to be done for each image in case of a series of images acquired after a single injection ("dynamic imaging").

=== Mass and Volume ===
The unit of c_{img} is MBq/mL or equivalent, based on (a) the pixel intensity calibrated with a radioactive source ("phantom") itself of known radioactivity and volume, and (b) the pixel volume or ROI volume. The unit of c_{inj} is MBq/g or equivalent, based on the measured radioactivity and the subject's body weight. This would give SUV in units of g/mL or equivalent. However, SUV is typically presented as a unitless parameter. One way to explain this simplification is by considering that the average mass density of the human body is typically close to 1 g/mL. Thus, while the body weight is usually measured and used for the SUV calculation, this is implicitly converted to the body volume in mL by division by 1 g/mL resulting in a unitless SUV parameter.

Alternatively, the c_{img} may be considered implicitly converted into a mass concentration assuming a mass density of 1 g/mL for the ROI volume which is a good approximation for some but not all tissues in the human body.

=== Equation ===
In summary this gives the following equation to calculate SUV at time t post injection,

$SUV(t) = \frac {c_{img}(t)} {ID / BW}$

with (1) the radioactivity measured from an image acquired at (or around) the time t, decay corrected to t=0 and expressed as volume concentration (e.g. MBq/mL), (2) the injected dose ID at t=0 (e.g. in MBq), and (3) the body weight BW (near the time of image acquisition) implicitly converted into the body volume assuming an average mass density of 1 g/mL.

A related measure more frequently used in preclinical PET and SPECT is the concentration in units of % ID/mL (percentage of the injected dose per mL of tissue) for biodistribution analysis. When obtained from radionuclear images, this is equal to

$\% ID/mL(t) = \frac {c_{img}(t)} {ID} \cdot 100\%$.

In other words, SUV can be interpreted as the % ID/mL normalized to (here, multiplied by) the body weight (or body volume) and expressed as fraction rather than percentage.

=== Further Considerations ===
Some authors replace the body weight by the lean body weight or the body surface area.

Also for $c(t)$ from a region of interest, different measures are found in the literature, e.g., the maximum intensity value within the ROI, the mean intensity value of the ROI, or the mean intensity value of the ROI after applying an intensity threshold (thus excluding a number of pixels of the ROI).

== Accuracy and Precision ==
The SUV can be significantly affected among other things by image noise, low image resolution and/or user biased ROI selection. For the semiquantitative analysis of [^{18}F]FDG uptake in tissue or tumor, several corrections have been recommended (see and references therein).

== SUVR ==
The ratio of the SUV data from two different regions within the same PET image (i.e. from a target and a reference region) is commonly abbreviated SUVR. An example is the ratio of regional Pittsburgh compound B PET signal intensity to the average signal of a much wider region. For the SUVR, the injected activity, the body weight and the mass density that are all part of the SUV calculation, cancel:

${\mathit{SUVR}} = \frac {\mathit{SUV_{target}}} {\mathit{SUV_{reference}}} = \frac {\mathit{c_{img,target}}} {\mathit{c_{img,reference}}} .$

== Outlook and Conclusions ==
As of 2007, the SUV concept had only begun to be tested for other radiotracers such as fluorothymidine F-18 ([^{18}F]FLT) and conclusions on its usefulness and robustness in these cases were considered premature then.

On the other hand, the underlying concept of organ mass dose scaling has been introduced as early as 1941 with renewed applications in the radionuclear field in the 1970s. That is to say that the concept itself has been applied and assessed for other radiotracers before the advent of [^{18}F]FDG PET decades later.

In summary, the SUV is a convenient measure for the comparison of [^{18}F]FDG PET images from subjects with different body masses. However, care has to be taken with respect to its pitfalls and with respect to the interpretation of results.

== See also ==
- Functional imaging
- Medical imaging
- Positron emission tomography
- Fluorodeoxyglucose
- Multi-compartment model
- Patlak plot
- Pharmacokinetics
- Physiologically-based pharmacokinetic modelling
