= Takk =

Takk may refer to:

- Takk..., a 2005 album by Icelandic band Sigur Rós
- Tank, Pakistan, a city in the Khyber Pakhtunkhwa Province
- Takk, a 2002 poetry collection by Gunnar Wærness
- Takkarist McKinley (born 1995), American football player

== See also ==
- Tak (disambiguation)
