= Arterial input function =

Arterial input function (AIF), also known as a plasma input function, refers to the concentration of tracer in blood-plasma in an artery measured over time. The oldest record on PubMed shows that AIF was used by Harvey et al. in 1962 to measure the exchange of materials between red blood cells and blood plasma, and by other researchers in 1983 for positron emission tomography (PET) studies. Nowadays, kinetic analysis is performed in various medical imaging techniques, which requires an AIF as one of the inputs to the mathematical model, for example, in dynamic PET imaging, or perfusion CT, or dynamic contrast-enhanced magnetic resonance imaging (DCE-MRI).

== How is AIF obtained ==
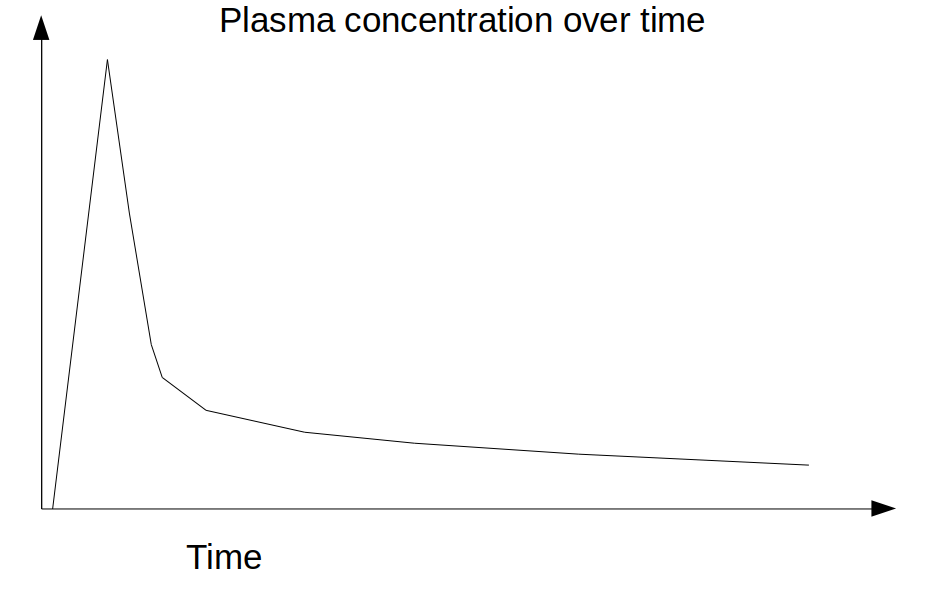
An example of an arterial input function showing the concentration of tracer in blood plasma over time.

AIF can be obtained in several different ways, for example, using the invasive method of continuous arterial sampling using an online blood monitor, using the invasive method of arterial blood samples obtained at discrete time points post-injection, using a minimally invasive method using a population-based AIF where an input function in a subject is estimated partly from the prior information obtained from a previous population and partly from the blood information from the subject itself obtained at the time of scanning, or using an image-derived arterial input function (IDAIF) obtained by placing a region of interest (ROI) over an artery and calibrating the resulting curves against venous blood samples obtained during the later phases (30 to 60 minutes) of the dynamic scan when venous and arterial tracer concentrations become equal.

A dynamic scan is a scan where two dimensional (2D) or three dimensional (3D) images are acquired again and again over a time-period forming a time-series of 2D/3D image datasets. For example, a dynamic PET scan acquired over a period of one hour contains the first few short image frames acquired for 5 seconds duration to capture the fast dynamics of the tracer immediately after a tracer-injection and later frames acquired for 30 seconds. Each data-point in the AIF curve represents a measurement of tracer-concentration from an artery obtained from each of these image time-frame acquired over time, with external corrections applied to it.

These four methods are briefly described as follows:

== Continuous arterial sampling ==
Continuous arterial blood sampling is invasive, painful, and uncomfortable for the patients. Continuous arterial sampling was obtained in postmenopausal women imaged using [^{18}F]NaF for bone studies.

== Discrete arterial sampling ==
Discrete arterial blood sampling is invasive, painful, and uncomfortable for the patients. Cook et al. measured discrete blood samples and compared them to continuous arterial sampling in postmenopausal women imaged using [^{18}F]NaF for bone studies. Another study in head and neck cancer patients imaged using [^{18}F]FLT PET, and numerous other studies, obtained discrete arterial samples for the estimation of arterial input function.

The approach of obtaining discrete arterial sampling was based on the observation that the bolus peak occurs with 5 minutes after injection, and that the latter part of the curve, in most cases, represent a single or bi-exponential curve. It implied that continuous arterial sampling was not necessary, and the discrete arterial blood samples were enough to obtain the continuous curves using an exponential model fit.

== Population-based method ==
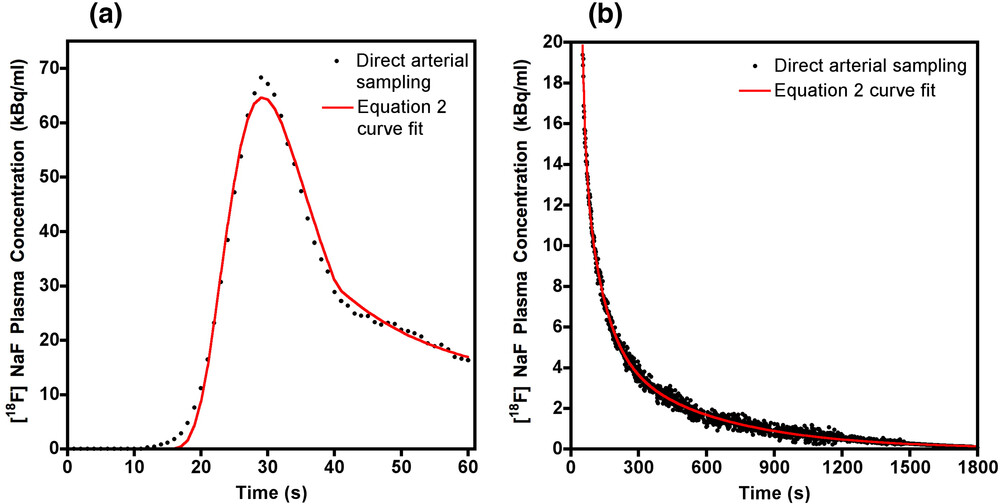
These plots show the average arterial plasma concentration residual curve at 1-second intervals, derived from direct arterial sampling in nine postmenopausal women and normalized to an injected activity of 100 MBq. (a) The first graph presents the residual curve from 0 to 60 seconds, (b) The second graph displays the curve from 60 to 1800 seconds. The black dots represent the mean measured values across the nine participants, while the red line indicates the fitted curve (based on the Equation below). To standardize the data, the timing of each individual curve was adjusted so that the peak tracer concentration aligned exactly 30 seconds post-injection.

A population-based input function generally relies on the dataset previously obtained by other researchers in a specific set of populations, and average values are used. The methods generally provide better results if a large number of datasets is used and based on the assumption that the input function in a new patient in this sub-group of the population will be insignificantly different from the population average values. In a neuroinflammation study, the author using a population-based input function in healthy volunteers and liver-transplanted patients imaged using [^{18}F]GE-180 PET. In another study, healthy controls and patients with Parkinson's and Alzheimer's disease were imaged using [^{18}F]FEPPA PET. Zanotti-Fregonara et al. thoroughly reviewed the literature on the arterial input function used for brain PET imaging and suggested the possibility of population-based arterial input functions as a potential alternative to invasive arterial sampling.

However, Blake et al. derived a semi-population based method from healthy postmenopausal women imaged using [^{18}F]NaF for bone studies based on the observation that the later part of the arterial input function can be constructed from the venous blood samples, as the venous and arterial blood concentration of tracer is equal 30 minutes after the injection. They derived the peak of the curve from a previous study that obtained continuous arterial sampling, and the later part of the curve from the venous blood samples of the individual patient in whom an AIF is to be estimated. When combined, a semi-population based arterial input function is obtained as a result.

A mathematical function that accurately reproduces this curve in units of kBq/ml in three separate time intervals is presented:

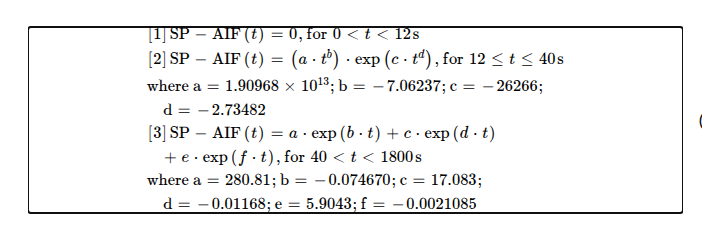
A mathematical function that accurately reproduces this curve in units of kBq/ml in three separate time intervals is presented

Semi-population model explanation: For a typical injected dose of 100 MBq, the area under the plasma concentration curve estimated using the model closely matches that from the original measured data, showing only a minor difference. To construct a one-hour arterial input function (AIF) for an individual, a standardized early-phase residual curve (covering 0–30 minutes) is scaled to the person's injected activity and combined with an exponential curve fitted to venous plasma samples taken between 30 and 60 minutes after injection.

The late-phase exponential typically contributes around 75–80% of the total AIF area over 60 minutes. This means the method captures most of the individual variation necessary to estimate tracer uptake (Ki), which is especially useful in treatment studies like those involving osteoporosis. The method assumes that treatment effects mainly alter the slower, late-phase component and have minimal impact on the early-phase peak related to rapid tracer delivery. As a result, Ki values derived using this method may differ slightly from those obtained via direct arterial sampling.

However, the model used to generate this input function was developed from a small, specific population and may not apply to all groups. It also isn't suitable for estimating bone blood flow (K1), as it uses an average early-phase response that might not reflect individual tracer kinetics immediately after injection. Accurate K1 estimation requires either arterial sampling or an image-derived method that captures arterial tracer levels within the first few minutes, corrected for imaging effects.

A major advantage of this approach is that it enables Ki measurements at multiple skeletal sites using short static scans taken during a single session, without the need for continuous dynamic scanning. Compared with other input function methods, this approach provides more precise Ki estimates with lower measurement errors.

Alternative implementations have used heart imaging instead of blood sampling to calibrate the residual function. Some versions multiply the terminal exponential rather than add to it, which may better adjust for differences in body size. In contrast, the additive approach might be more suitable when treatment or disease significantly affects the late-phase kinetics. Studies comparing these methods have shown that both produce consistent Ki values, and combining this approach with static scanning can substantially reduce overall imaging time.

== Image-derived method ==
An image-derived arterial input function (IDAIF) obtained by measuring the tracer counts over the aorta, carodit artery, or radial artery offers an alternative to invasive arterial blood sampling. An IDAIF at the aorta can be determined by measuring the tracer counts over the left ventricle, ascending aorta, and abdominal aorta and this has been previously validated by various researchers.

The arterial time-activity curve (TAC) from the image data requires corrections for metabolites formed over time, differences between whole blood and plasma activity, which are not constant over time, correction for partial volume errors (PVE) due to the small size of the ROI, spill-over errors due to activity from neighbouring tissues outside the ROI, error due to patient movement, and noise introduced due to the limited number of counts acquired in each image time frame because of the short time frames. These errors are corrected using late venous blood samples, and the resulting curve is called an arterial input function (AIF). There are numerous methods tried by researchers over the years.

== See also ==
- Positron emission tomography (PET)
- Time-activity curves (TAC)
- PET for bone imaging
