= Tacking =

Tacking may refer to:

- Tacking (sailing) or coming about, a sailing maneuver
- Tacking (law), a legal concept relating to competing priorities between interests arising over the same asset
- Tacking (album), a 2005 album by Swedish band The Embassy
- "Tackin'", an episode of the American TV series Sit Down, Shut Up

== See also ==
- Tack (disambiguation)
