= Təkdam =

Coordinates: 40°06′N 45°59′E

Təkdam is a village and municipality in the Masally Rayon of Azerbaijan. It has a population of 469.
