= Motorola TAC =

TAC (Total Area Coverage) was a brand used by Motorola for some of their mobile phone product families. It may refer to:

- DynaTAC, introduced in 1984
- MicroTAC, introduced in 1989
- TeleTAC, introduced in 1992
- CipherTAC, introduced in 1996
- StarTAC, introduced in 1996
