= Tak (given name) =

Tak is a given name and a nickname. Notable people with the name include:

== Given name ==
- Au Tak (1840–1920), Hong Kong entrepreneur
- Tak Fujimoto (born 1939), American cinematographer
- Tak Matsumoto (born 1961), Japanese rock guitarist
- Tak Sakaguchi (born 1975), Japanese actor, director, fight choreographer and stuntman
- U Tak (1262–1342), Korean Neo-Confucian scholar

== Nickname ==
- Takashi Tak Fujimoto (born 1939), American cinematographer
- Takahiro Tak Matsumoto (born 1961), Japanese guitarist, singer, songwriter and record producer
- Takeshi Tak Shindo (1922–2002), Japanese-American exotica musician
