= Perfusion CT =

Perfusion scanning using CT

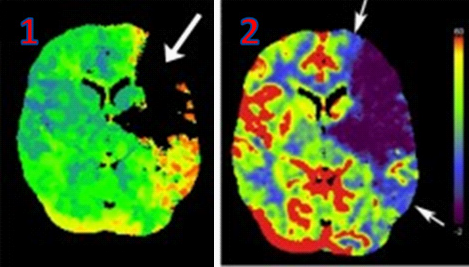
- CT perfusion with flow and volume maps in cerebral infarction
- Synonyms: CT perfusion
- Purpose: Perfusion scanning using CT
- Based on: Temporal changes in tissue attenuation after injection of contrast

Perfusion CT (also CT perfusion or CTP) is a form of perfusion scanning that uses computed tomography to assess the vascularity of tissues in the body. By measuring temporal changes in tissue attenuation following intravenous injection of an iodinated contrast agent CTP generates quantitative parametric maps of haemodynamic parameters including cerebral blood flow, mean transit time (MTT), and time to peak (TTP). These maps provide functional information about capillary-level blood supply that complements the anatomical information obtained from conventional CT.

== Clinical use ==
=== Acute ischemic stroke ===
CT perfusion plays an important role in the assessment of acute ischemic stroke. It is used to create maps of blood flow, blood volume, and mean transit time to assess the tissue, and to differentiate between the core and penumbra in stroke.
