= Electron tomography =

Tomography technique

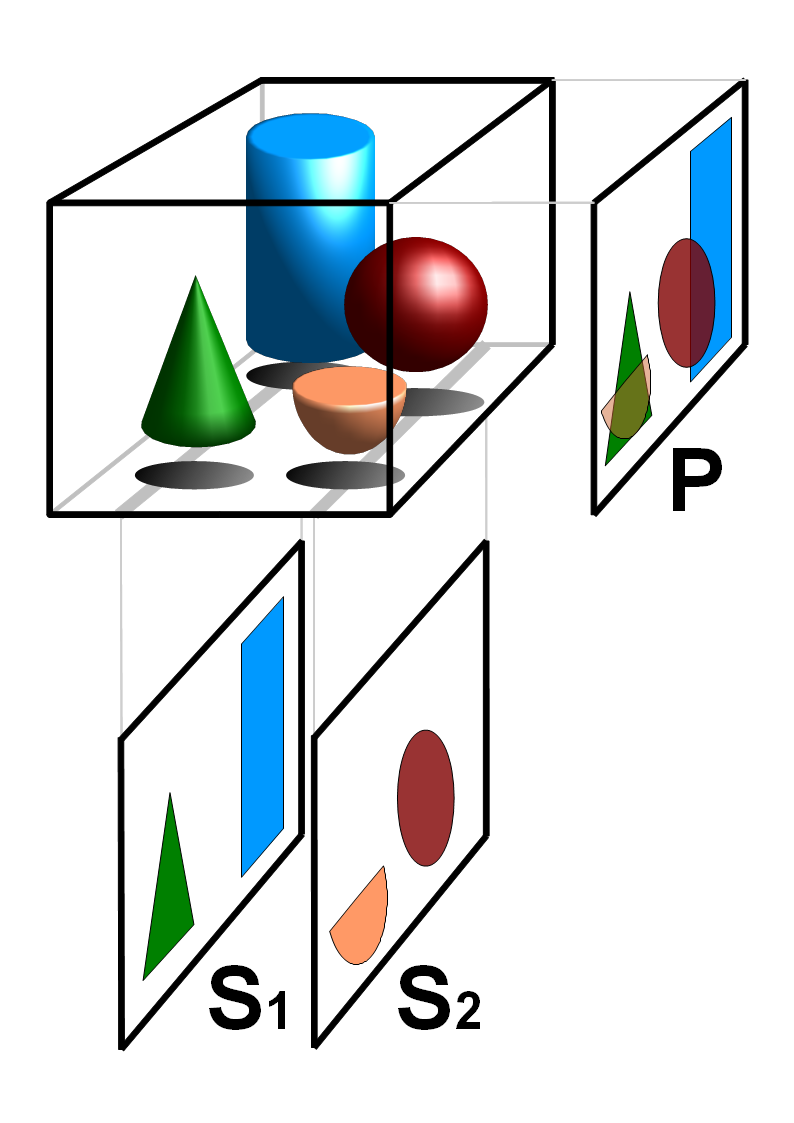
Basic principle of tomography: superposition free tomographic cross sections S_{1} and S_{2} compared with the projected image P

Electron tomography (ET) is a tomography technique for obtaining detailed 3D structures of sub-cellular, macro-molecular, or materials specimens. Electron tomography is an extension of traditional transmission electron microscopy and uses a transmission electron microscope to collect the data. In the process, a beam of electrons is passed through the sample at incremental degrees of rotation around the center of the target sample. This information is collected and used to assemble a three-dimensional image of the target. For biological applications, the typical resolution of ET systems are in the 5–20 nm range, suitable for examining supra-molecular multi-protein structures, although not the secondary and tertiary structure of an individual protein or polypeptide. Recently, atomic resolution in 3D electron tomography reconstructions has been demonstrated.

== BF-TEM and ADF-STEM tomography ==
In the field of biology, bright-field transmission electron microscopy (BF-TEM) and high-resolution TEM (HRTEM) are the primary imaging methods for tomography tilt series acquisition. However, there are two issues associated with BF-TEM and HRTEM. First, acquiring an interpretable 3-D tomogram requires that the projected image intensities vary monotonically with material thickness. This condition is difficult to guarantee in BF/HRTEM, where image intensities are dominated by phase-contrast with the potential for multiple contrast reversals with thickness, making it difficult to distinguish voids from high-density inclusions. Second, the contrast transfer function of BF-TEM is essentially a high-pass filter – information at low spatial frequencies is significantly suppressed – resulting in an exaggeration of sharp features. However, the technique of annular dark-field scanning transmission electron microscopy (ADF-STEM), which is typically used on material specimens, more effectively suppresses phase and diffraction contrast, providing image intensities that vary with the projected mass-thickness of samples up to micrometres thick for materials with low atomic number. ADF-STEM also acts as a low-pass filter, eliminating the edge-enhancing artifacts common in BF/HRTEM. Thus, provided that the features can be resolved, ADF-STEM tomography can yield a reliable reconstruction of the underlying specimen which is extremely important for its application in materials science. For 3D imaging, the resolution is traditionally described by the Crowther criterion. In 2010, a 3D resolution of 0.5±0.1×0.5±0.1×0.7±0.2 nm was achieved with a single-axis ADF-STEM tomography.

== Atomic Electron Tomography (AET) ==
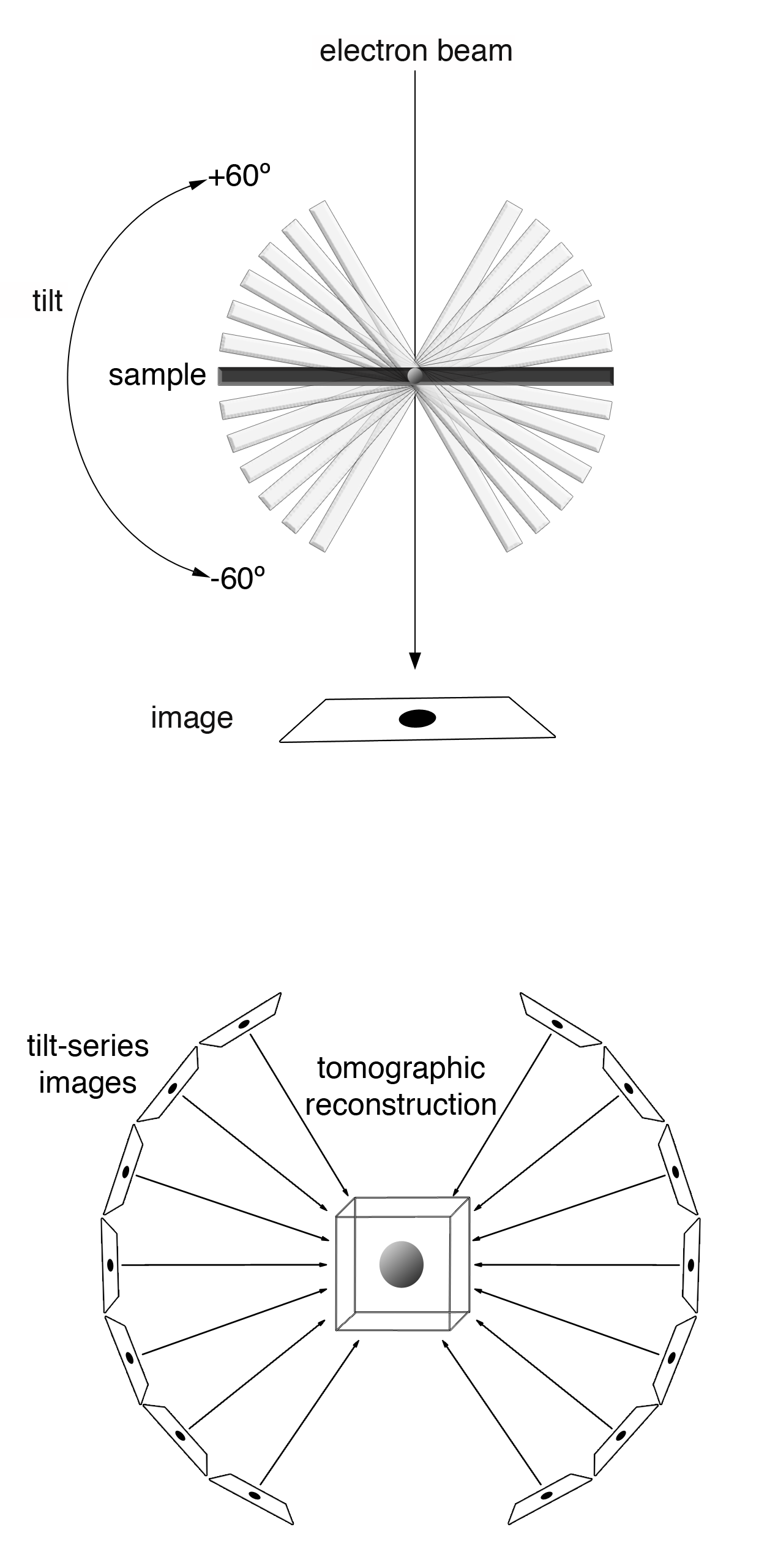
Schematic showing the concept of electron tomography.

Atomic level resolution in 3D electron tomography reconstructions has been demonstrated. With the aid of computational ptychography, identification and precise 3D coordinates of every single atom in tiny objects have been imaged, clearly depicting molecular structures at large and small scales. Reconstructions of crystal defects such as stacking faults, grain boundaries, dislocations, and twinning in structures have been achieved. This method is relevant to the physical sciences, where cryo-EM techniques cannot always be used to locate the coordinates of individual atoms in disordered materials. AET reconstructions are achieved using the combination of an ADF-STEM tomographic tilt series and iterative algorithms for reconstruction. Currently, algorithms such as the real-space algebraic reconstruction technique (ART) and the fast Fourier transform equal slope tomography (EST) are used to address issues such as image noise, sample drift, and limited data. ADF-STEM tomography has recently been used to directly visualize the atomic structure of screw dislocations in nanoparticles. AET has also been used to find the 3D coordinates of 3,769 atoms in a tungsten needle with 19 pm precision and 20,000 atoms in a multiply twinned palladium nanoparticle. The combination of AET with electron energy loss spectroscopy (EELS) allows for investigation of electronic states in addition to 3D reconstruction. Challenges to atomic level resolution from electron tomography include the need for better reconstruction algorithms and increased precision of tilt angle required to image defects in non-crystalline samples.

=== Different tilting methods ===
The most popular tilting methods are the single-axis and the dual-axis tilting methods. The geometry of most specimen holders and electron microscopes normally precludes tilting the specimen through a full 180° range, which can lead to artifacts in the 3D reconstruction of the target. Standard single-tilt sample holders have a limited rotation of ±80°, leading to a missing wedge in the reconstruction. A solution is to use needle shaped-samples to allow for full rotation. By using dual-axis tilting, the reconstruction artifacts are reduced by a factor of $\sqrt{2}$ compared to single-axis tilting. However, twice as many images need to be taken. Another method of obtaining a tilt-series is the so-called conical tomography method, in which the sample is tilted, and then rotated a complete turn.

== See also ==
- Tomography
- Tomographic reconstruction
- 3D reconstruction
- Cryo-electron tomography
- Positron emission tomography
- Crowther criterion
- X-ray computed tomography
- tomviz tomography software
- imod tomography software
- X-ray diffraction computed tomography
