= K-transform =

In mathematics, the K transform (also called the Single-Pixel X-ray Transform) is an integral transform introduced by R. Scott Kemp and Ruaridh Macdonald in 2016. The transform allows the structure of a N-dimensional inhomogeneous object to be reconstructed from scalar point measurements taken in the volume external to the object.

Gunther Uhlmann proved that the K transform exhibits global uniqueness on $\mathbb R^n$, meaning that different objects will always have a different K transform. This uniqueness arises from the use of a monotone, nonlinear transform of the X-ray transform. By selecting the exponential function for the monotone nonlinear function, the behavior of the K transform coincides with attenuation of particles in matter as described by the Beer–Lambert law, and the K transform can therefore be used to perform tomography of objects using a low-resolution single-pixel detector.

An inversion formula based on a linearization was offered by Lai et al., who also showed that the inversion is stable under certain assumptions. A numerical inversion using the BFGS optimization algorithm was explored by Fichtlscherer.

== Definition ==
Let an object $f$ be a function of compact support that maps into the positive real numbers
$$f:\Omega\rightarrow\mathbb{R}^{+}_0 .$$
The K-transform of the object $f$ is defined as
$$\mathcal{K}:L^1(\Omega,\mathbb{P}^{+}_0)\rightarrow[0,1],$$
$$\mathcal{K}f(r)\equiv\int_{L_D(r)}e^{\mathcal{P}f(l)}\,dl,$$
where $L_D(r)\equiv L(r)\cap L(D)$ is the set of all lines originating at a point $r$ and terminating on the single-pixel detector $D$, and $\mathcal{P}$ is the X-ray transform.

== Proof of global uniqueness ==
Let $\mathcal{P}f$ be the X-ray transform transform on $\mathbb{R}^n$ and let $\mathcal{K}$ be the non-linear operator defined above. Let $L^1$ be the space of all Lebesgue integrable functions on $\mathbb{R}^n$ , and $L^\infty$ be the essentially bounded measurable functions of the dual space. The following result says that $-\mathcal{K}$ is a monotone operator.

For $f,g\in L^1$ such that $\mathcal{K}f,\mathcal{K}g\in L^\infty$ then
$$\langle\mathcal{K}f-\mathcal{K}g,f-g\rangle\leq 0$$
and the inequality is strict when $f\neq g$.

Proof. Note that $\mathcal{P}f(r,\theta)$ is constant on lines in direction $\theta$, so $\mathcal{P}f(r,\theta)=\mathcal{P}f(E_\theta r,\theta)$, where $E_\theta$ denotes orthogonal projection on $\theta^\bot$. Therefore:

$$\langle\mathcal{K}f-\mathcal{K}g,f-g\rangle =\int_{\mathbb{R}^n}\int_{\mathbb{S}^{n-1}} \left(e^{-\mathcal{P}f(r,\theta)}-e^{-\mathcal{P}g(r,\theta)}\right)(f-g)(r)\,d\theta\, dr$$

$$=\int_{\mathbb{S}^{n-1}}\int_{\mathbb{R}^n} \left(e^{-\mathcal{P}f(r,\theta)}-e^{-\mathcal{P}g(r,\theta)}\right)(f-g)(r)\,dr\,d\theta$$

$$=\int_{\mathbb{S}^{n-1}}\int_{\theta^\bot} \left(e^{-\mathcal{P}f(E_\theta r,\theta)}-e^{-\mathcal{P}g(E_\theta r,\theta)}\right)\int_\mathbb{R}(f-g)(E_\theta r+s\theta)\,ds\,dr_{\!H}\,d\theta$$

$$=\int_{\mathbb{S}^{n-1}}\int_{\theta^\bot} \left(e^{-\mathcal{P}f(E_\theta r,\theta)}-e^{-\mathcal{P}g(E_\theta r,\theta)}\right)\left(\mathcal{P}f(E_\theta r,\theta)-\mathcal{P}g(E_\theta r,\theta)\right)dr_{\!H}\,d\theta$$

where $dr_{\!H}$ is the Lebesgue measure on the hyperplane $\theta^\bot$. The integrand has the form $(e^{-s}-e^{-t})(s-t)$, which is negative except when $s=t$ and so $\langle\mathcal{K}f-\mathcal{K}g,f-g\rangle<0$ unless $\mathcal{P}f=\mathcal{P}g$ almost everywhere. Then uniqueness for the X-Ray transform implies that $g=f$ almost everywhere. $\blacksquare$

Lai et al. generalized this proof to Riemannian manifolds.

== Applications ==
The K transform was originally developed as a means of performing a physical one-time pad encryption of a physical object. The nonlinearity of the transform ensures the there is no one-to-one correspondence between the density $f$ and the true mass $\int_{\mathbb{S}^{n-1}}\int_\mathbb{R}f(x+s\theta)\,ds\,d\theta$, and therefore $f$ cannot be estimated from a single projection.
