= List of microscopy visualization systems =

This is a list of software systems that are used for visualizing microscopy data.

For each software system, the table below indicates which type of data can be displayed: EM = Electron microscopy; MG = Molecular graphics; Optical = Optical microscopy.

| Name | Applications | License | Supported OS | Citation | Comments |
|---|---|---|---|---|---|
| Amira | EM MRI MG Optical | commercial | | | 4D cube for life applications |
| Avizo | EM MG Optical MRI | commercial | Windows, Linux, Mac | | 4D cube for industry applications |
| MountainsMap Image | Optical | commercial | Windows | | includes shaded spots quantification, contour metrology |
| MountainsMap SEM | EM Optical | commercial | Windows | | includes SEM 3D stereo reconstruction |
| IMOD | EM Optical | free and open-source | | | |
| tomviz | EM Optical | free and open-source | Windows, Linux, Mac | | Integrates Python / SciPy |
| OME | EM Optical | free and open-source | | | |

== See also ==
- Biological data visualization
- List of molecular graphics systems
