= Sart (disambiguation) =

Sart is a name for the settled inhabitants of Central Asia.

Sart, Le Sart, or SART may also refer to:

== Places ==
=== France ===
- Le Sart, a village in the commune of Merville, Nord department, France
- Anguilcourt-le-Sart, a village and commune in the Aisne department, France
- Fesmy-le-Sart, a village and commune in the Aisne department, France

=== Belgium ===
- Sart-lez-Spa, a village adjoined to Jalhay, Liege Province, Belgium.
- Le Sart, a hamlet near Neufchâteau, Luxembourg Province, Belgium
- Le Sart, a hamlet near Bertrix, in Luxembourg Province, Belgium

=== Turkey ===
- Sart, Salihli, a neighbourhood of the municipality of Salihli, Turkey

== Other uses ==
- Sart (album), by Norwegian saxophonist Jan Garbarek
- Chagatai language, also known as Sart
- Santa Ana River Trail
- Search and rescue transponder
- Sexual assault response team
- Simultaneous algebraic reconstruction technique
