= X-ray microtomography =

X-ray 3D imaging method

3D rendering of a micro CT of a treehopper

3D rendering of a μCT scan of a leaf piece, resolution c. 40 μm/voxel

Two phase μCT analysis of Ti2AlC/Al MAX phase composite

In radiography, X-ray microtomography uses X-rays to create cross-sections of a physical object that can be used to recreate a virtual model (3D model) without destroying the original object. It is similar to tomography and X-ray computed tomography. The prefix micro- (symbol: μ) is used to indicate that the pixel sizes of the cross-sections are in the micrometre range. These pixel sizes have also resulted in creation of its synonyms high-resolution X-ray tomography, micro-computed tomography (micro-CT or μCT), and similar terms. Sometimes the terms high-resolution computed tomography (HRCT) and micro-CT are differentiated, but in other cases the term high-resolution micro-CT is used. Virtually all tomography today is computed tomography.

Micro-CT has applications both in medical imaging and in industrial computed tomography. In general, there are two types of scanner setups. In one setup, the X-ray source and detector are typically stationary during the scan while the sample/animal rotates. The second setup, much more like a clinical CT scanner, is gantry based where the animal/specimen is stationary in space while the X-ray tube and detector rotate around. These scanners are typically used for small animals (in vivo scanners), biomedical samples, foods, microfossils, and other studies for which minute detail is desired.

The first X-ray microtomography system was conceived and built by Professor James C. Elliott at the London Hospital Medical College in the early 1980s. The first published X-ray microtomographic images were reconstructed slices of a small neotropical snail (Biomphalaria glabrata), with pixel size about 50 micrometers.

== Working principle ==
=== Imaging system ===
==== Fan beam reconstruction ====
The fan-beam system is based on a one-dimensional (1D) X-ray detector and an electronic X-ray source, creating 2D cross-sections of the object. Typically used in human computed tomography systems.

==== Cone beam reconstruction ====
The cone-beam system is based on a 2D X-ray detector (camera) and an electronic X-ray source, creating projection images that later will be used to reconstruct the image cross-sections.

=== Open/Closed systems ===
==== Open X-ray system ====
In an open system, X-rays may escape or leak out, thus the operator must stay behind a shield, have special protective clothing, or operate the scanner from a distance or a different room. Typical examples of these scanners are the human versions, or designed for big objects.

==== Closed X-ray system ====
In a closed system, X-ray shielding is put around the scanner so the operator can put the scanner on a desk or special table. Although the scanner is shielded, care must be taken and the operator usually carries a dosimeter, since X-rays have a tendency to be absorbed by metal and then re-emitted like an antenna. Although a typical scanner will produce a relatively harmless volume of X-rays, repeated scannings in a short timeframe could pose a danger. Digital detectors with small pixel pitches and micro-focus x-ray tubes are usually employed to yield in high resolution images.

Closed systems tend to become very heavy because lead is used to shield the X-rays. Therefore, the smaller scanners only have a small space for samples.

== 3D image reconstruction ==
Series of projections scanning a webcam with a cone beam μCT system at 100kV tube voltage and 12W tube power

=== The principle ===
Because microtomography scanners offer isotropic, or near isotropic, resolution, display of images does not need to be restricted to the conventional axial images. Instead, it is possible for a software program to build a volume by 'stacking' the individual slices one on top of the other. The program may then display the volume in an alternative manner.

=== Image reconstruction software ===
For X-ray microtomography, powerful open source software is available, such as the ASTRA toolbox. The ASTRA Toolbox is a MATLAB and python toolbox of high-performance GPU primitives for 2D and 3D tomography, from 2009 to 2014 developed by iMinds-Vision Lab, University of Antwerp and since 2014 jointly developed by iMinds-VisionLab, UAntwerpen and CWI, Amsterdam. The toolbox supports parallel, fan, and cone beam, with highly flexible source/detector positioning. A large number of reconstruction algorithms are available, including FBP, ART, SIRT, SART, CGLS.

For 3D visualization, tomviz is a popular open-source tool for tomography.

=== Volume rendering ===
Volume rendering is a technique used to display a 2D projection of a 3D discretely sampled data set, as produced by a microtomography scanner. Usually these are acquired in a regular pattern, e.g., one slice every millimeter, and usually have a regular number of image pixels in a regular pattern. This is an example of a regular volumetric grid, with each volume element, or voxel represented by a single value that is obtained by sampling the immediate area surrounding the voxel.

=== Image segmentation ===
Where different structures have similar threshold density, it can become impossible to separate them simply by adjusting volume rendering parameters. The solution is called segmentation, a manual or automatic procedure that can remove the unwanted structures from the image.

== Typical use ==
=== Archaeology ===
- Reconstructing fire-damaged artifacts, such as the En-Gedi Scroll and Herculaneum papyri
- Cultural heritage items including unpacking cuneiform tablets wrapped in clay envelopes and clay tokens

=== Petroleum engineering ===
A notable application of micro-CT in reservoir characterization is the construction of digital rock models to assess anisotropic flow properties.

=== Biomedical ===
- Both in vitro and in vivo small animal imaging
- Neurons
- Human skin samples
- Bone samples, including teeth, ranging in size from rodents to human biopsies
- Lung imaging using respiratory gating
- Cardiovascular imaging using cardiac gating
- Imaging of the human eye, ocular microstructures and tumors
- Tumor imaging (may require contrast agents)
- Soft tissue imaging
- Insects – Insect development
- Parasitology – migration of parasites, parasite morphology
- Tablet consistency checks

Developmental biology

- Tracing the development of the extinct Tasmanian tiger during growth in the pouch
- Model and non-model organisms (elephants, zebrafish, and whales)

=== Electronics ===
- Small electronic components. E.g. DRAM IC in plastic case.

=== Microdevices ===
- Spray nozzle

=== Composite materials and metallic foams ===
- Ceramics and Ceramic–Metal composites. Microstructural analysis and failure investigation
- Composite material with glass fibers 10 to 12 micrometres in diameter

=== Polymers, plastics ===
- Plastic foam

=== Diamonds ===
- Detecting defects in a diamond and finding the best way to cut it.

=== Food and seeds ===
- 3-D imaging of foods
- Analysing heat and drought stress on food crops
- Bubble detection in squeaky cheese

=== Wood and paper ===
- Piece of wood to visualize year periodicity and cell structure

=== Building materials ===
- Heritage building materials
- Concrete after loading

=== Geology ===
In geology it is used to analyze micro pores in the reservoir rocks, it can be used in microfacies analysis for sequence stratigraphy. In petroleum exploration it is used to model the petroleum flow under micro pores and nano particles.

It can give a resolution up to 1 nm.

- Sandstone
- Porosity and flow studies

=== Fossils ===
- Vertebrates
- Invertebrates

=== Microfossils ===
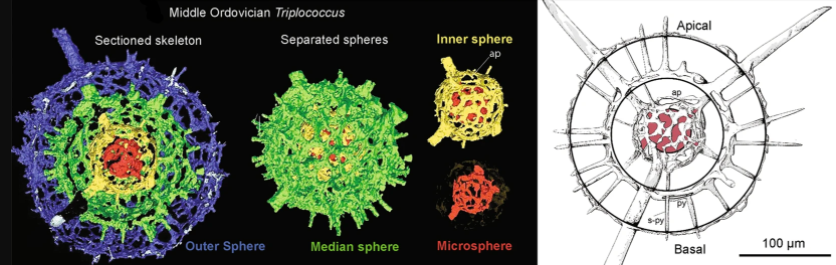
X-ray microtomography of a radiolarian, Triplococcus acanthicus This is a microfossil from the Middle Ordovician with four nested spheres. The innermost sphere is highlighted red. Each segment is shown at the same scale.

- Benthic foraminifera

=== Palaeography ===
- Digitally unfolding letters of correspondence which employed letterlocking.

=== Space ===
- Locating stardust-like particles in aerogel using X-ray techniques
- Samples returned from asteroid 25143 Itokawa by the Hayabusa mission

=== Stereo images ===
- Visualizing with blue and green or blue filters to see depth

=== Others ===
- Cigarettes
- Social insect nests

== See also ==
- Synchrotron
- Mind uploading
