= Dark-field X-ray microscopy =

Synchrotron X-ray diffraction-based imaging technique

Dark-field X-ray microscopy (DFXM or DFXRM) is an imaging technique used for multiscale structural characterisation. It is capable of mapping deeply embedded structural elements with nm-resolution using synchrotron X-ray diffraction-based imaging. The technique works by using scattered X-rays to create a high degree of contrast, and by measuring the intensity and spatial distribution of the diffracted beams, it is possible to obtain a three-dimensional map of the sample's structure, orientation, and local strain.

== History ==
The first experimental demonstration of dark-field X-ray microscopy was reported in 2006 by a group at the European Synchrotron Radiation Facility in Grenoble, France. Since then, the technique has been rapidly evolving and has shown great promise in multiscale structural characterization. Its development is largely due to advances in synchrotron X-ray sources, which provide highly collimated and intense beams of X-rays. The development of dark-field X-ray microscopy has been driven by the need for non-destructive imaging of bulk crystalline samples at high resolution, and it continues to be an active area of research today. However, dark-field microscopy, dark-field scanning transmission X-ray microscopy, and soft dark-field X-ray microscopy has long been used to map deeply embedded structural elements.

== Principles and instrumentation ==
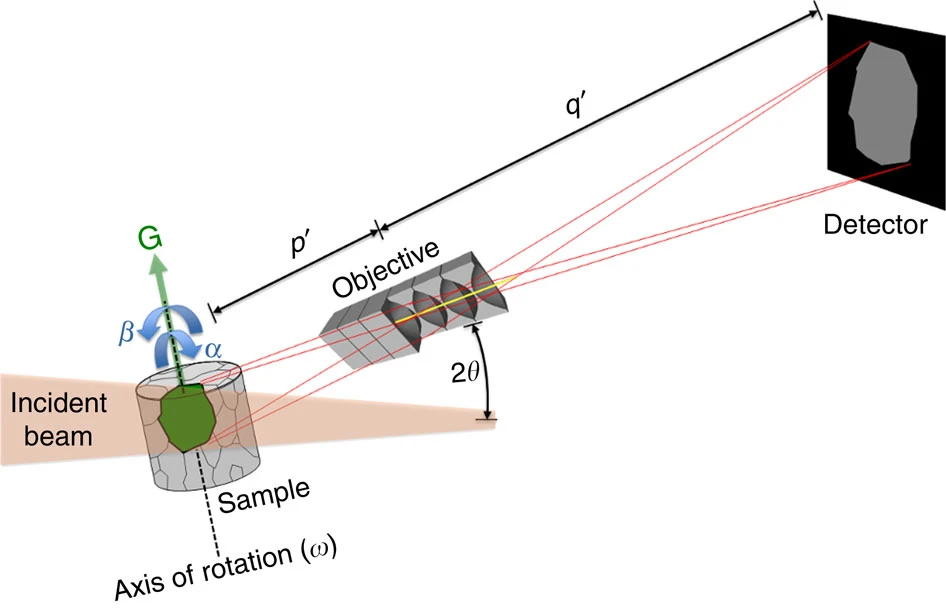
A monochromatic beam from a synchrotron source illuminates the sample. Objective is the objective lens and Detector is the 2D area detector

In this technique, a synchrotron light source is used to generate an intense and coherent X-ray beam, which is then focused onto the sample using a specialized objective lens. The objective lens acts as a collimator to select and focus the scattered light, which is then detected by the 2D detector to create a diffraction pattern. The specialized objective lens in DFXM, referred to as an X-ray objective lens, is a crucial component of the instrumentation required for the technique. It can be made from different materials such as beryllium, silicon, and diamond, depending on the specific requirements of the experiment. The objective enables one to enlarge or reduce the spatial resolution and field of view within the sample by varying the number of individual lenses and adjusting $p'$ and $q'$ (as in the figure) correspondingly. The diffraction angle $2\theta$ is typically 10–30°.

The sample is positioned at an angle such that the direct beam is blocked by a beam stop or aperture, and the diffracted beams from the sample are allowed to pass through a detector.

An embedded crystalline element (for example, a grain or domain) of choice (green) is aligned such that the detector is positioned at a Bragg angle that corresponds to a particular diffraction peak of interest, which is determined by the crystal structure of the sample. The objective magnifies the diffracted beam by a factor $M=q'/p'$ and generates an inverted 2D projection of the grain. Through repeated exposures during a 360° rotation of the element around an axis parallel to the diffraction vector, $G$, several 2D projections of the grain are obtained from various angles. A 3D map is then obtained by combining these projections using reconstruction algorithms similar to those developed for CT scanning. If the lattice of the crystalline element exhibits an internal orientation spread, this procedure is repeated for a number of sample tilts, indicated by the angles $\alpha$ and $\beta$.

The current implementation of DFXM at ID06, ESRF, uses a compound refractive lens (CRL) as the objective, giving spatial resolution of 100 nm and angular resolution of 0.001°.

== Applications, limitations and alternatives ==
=== Current and potential applications ===
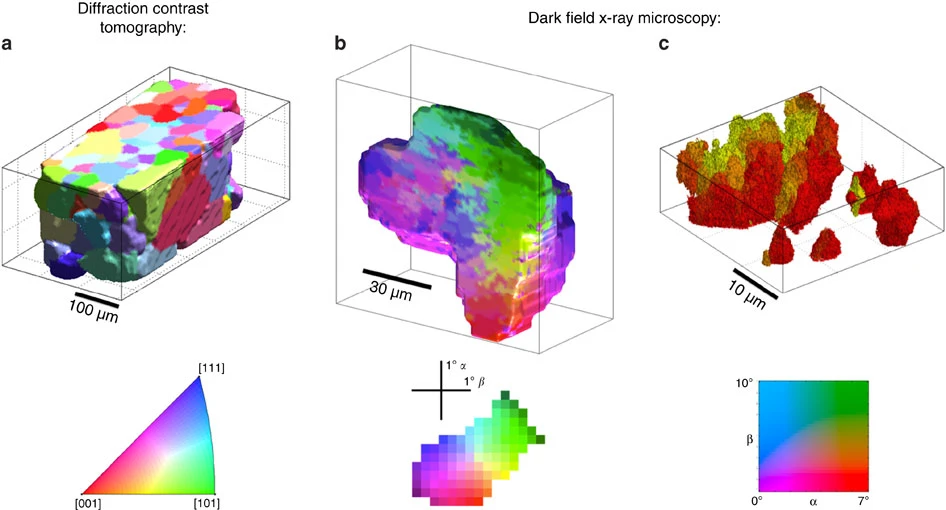
Multiscale mapping of 10% tensile deformed aluminium. (a) Part of the X-ray mapping of all grains in the specimen. (b) Zooming in on one embedded grain and mapping the intrinsic variation in orientation. A vertical section through the grain is shown for ease of inspection of the spatial heterogeneity. (c) Condensing the incoming beam vertically defines a sub-micron layer within the grain. Below: The corresponding keys for the orientation maps

DFXM has been used for the non-destructive investigation of polycrystalline materials and composites, revealing the 3D microstructure, phases, orientation of individual grains, and local strains. It has also been used for in situ studies of materials recrystallisation, dislocations and other defects, and the deformation and fracture mechanisms in materials, such as metals and composites. DFXM can provide insights into the 3D microstructure and deformation of geological materials such as minerals and rocks, and irradiated materials.

DFXM has the potential to revolutionise the field of nanotechnology by providing non-destructive, high-resolution 3D imaging of nanostructures and nanomaterials. It has been used to investigate the 3D morphology of nanowires and to detect structural defects in nanotubes.

DFXM has shown potential for imaging biological tissues and organs with high contrast and resolution. It has been used to visualize the 3D microstructure of cartilage and bone, as well as to detect early-stage breast cancer in mouse model.

=== Limitations ===
The intense X-ray beams used in DFXM can damage delicate samples, particularly biological specimens. DFXM can suffer from imaging artefacts such as ring artefacts, which can affect image quality and limit interpretation.

The instrumentation required for DFXM is expensive and typically only available at synchrotron facilities, making it inaccessible to many researchers. Although DFXM can achieve high spatial resolution, it is still not as high as the resolution achieved by other imaging techniques such as transmission electron microscopy (TEM) or X-ray crystallography.

Preparation of samples for DFXM imaging can be challenging, especially for samples that are not crystalline. There are also limitations on the sample size that can be imaged as the technique works best with thin samples, typically less than 100 microns thick, due to the attenuation of the X-ray beam by thicker samples. DFXM still suffers from long integration times, which can limit its practical applications. This is due to the low flux density of X-rays emitted by synchrotron sources and the high sensitivity required to detect scattered X-rays.

=== Alternatives ===
There are several alternative techniques to DFXM, depending on the application, some of which are:

- Differential-aperture X-ray structural microscopy (DAXM): DAXM is a synchrotron X-ray method capable of delivering precise information about the local structure and crystallographic orientation in three dimensions at a spatial resolution of less than one micron. It also provides angular precision and local elastic strain with high accuracy a wide range of materials, including single crystals, polycrystals, composites, and materials with varying properties.
- Bragg Coherent diffraction imaging (BCDI): BCDI is an advanced microscopy technique introduced in 2006 to study crystalline nanomaterials' 3D structure. BCDI has applications in diverse areas, including in situ studies of corrosion, probing dissolution processes, and simulating diffraction patterns to understand atomic displacement.
- Ptychography is a computational imaging method used in microscopy to generate images by processing multiple coherent interference patterns. It provides advantages such as high-resolution imaging, phase retrieval, and lensless imaging capabilities.
- Diffraction Contrast Tomography (DCT): DCT is a method that uses coherent X-rays to generate three-dimensional grain maps of polycrystalline materials. DCT enables visualization of crystallographic information within samples, aiding in the analysis of materials' structural properties, defects, and grain orientations.
- Three-dimensional X-ray diffraction (3DXRD): 3DXRD is a synchrotron-based technique that provides information about the crystallographic orientation of individual grains in polycrystalline materials. It can be used to study the evolution of microstructure during deformation and recrystallization processes and provides submicron resolution.
- Electron backscatter diffraction (EBSD): EBSD is a scanning electron microscopy (SEM) technique that can be used to map - the sample surface - crystallographic orientation and strain at the submicron scale. It works by detecting the diffraction pattern of backscattered electrons, which provides information about the crystal structure of the material. EBSD can be used on a variety of materials, including metals, ceramics, and semiconductors, and can be extended to the third dimension, i.e., 3D EBSD, and can be combined with Digital image correlation, i.e., EBSD-DIC.
- Digital image correlation (DIC): DIC is a non-contact optical method used to measure the displacement and deformation of a material by analysing the digital images captured before and after the application of load. This technique can measure strain with sub-pixel accuracy and is widely used in materials science and engineering.
- Transmission electron microscopy (TEM): TEM is a high-resolution imaging technique that provides information about the microstructure and crystallographic orientation of materials. It can be used to study the evolution of microstructure during deformation and recrystallization processes and provides submicron resolution.
- Micro-Raman spectroscopy: Micro-Raman spectroscopy is a non-destructive technique that can be used to measure the strain of a material at the submicron scale. It works by illuminating a sample with a laser beam and analysing the scattered light. The frequency shift of the scattered light provides information about the crystal deformation, and thus the strain of the material.
- Neutron diffraction: Neutron diffraction is a technique that uses a beam of neutrons to study the structure of materials. It is particularly useful for studying the crystal structure and magnetic properties of materials. Neutron diffraction can provide sub-micron resolution.
