= Three-dimensional X-ray diffraction =

Microscopy technique using X-rays

Three-dimensional X-ray diffraction (3DXRD) is a microscopy technique using hard X-rays (with energy in the 30-100 keV range) to investigate the internal structure of polycrystalline materials in three dimensions. For a given sample, 3DXRD returns the shape, juxtaposition, and orientation of the crystallites ("grains") it is made of. 3DXRD allows investigating micrometer- to millimetre-sized samples with resolution ranging from hundreds of nanometers to micrometers. Other techniques employing X-rays to investigate the internal structure of polycrystalline materials include X-ray diffraction contrast tomography (DCT) and high energy X-ray diffraction (HEDM).

Compared with destructive techniques, e.g. three-dimensional electron backscatter diffraction (3D EBSD), with which the sample is serially sectioned and imaged, 3DXRD and similar X-ray nondestructive techniques have the following advantages:

- They require less sample preparation, thus limiting the introduction of new structures in the sample.
- They can be used to investigate larger samples and to employ more complicated sample environments.
- They enable to study how 3D grain structures evolve with time.
- Since measurements do not alter the sample, different types of analysis can be made in sequence.

== Experimental setup ==
3DXRD measurements are performed using various experimental geometries. The classical 3DXRD setup is similar to the conventional tomography setting used at synchrotrons: the sample, mounted on a rotation stage, is illuminated using quasi-parallel monochromatic X-ray beam. Each time a certain grain within the sample satisfies the Bragg condition, a diffracted beam is generated. This signal is transmitted through the sample and collected by two-dimensional detectors. Since different grains satisfy the Bragg condition at different angles, the sample is rotated to probe the complete sample structure. Crucial for 3DXRD is the idea to mimic a three-dimensional detector by positioning a number of two-dimensional detectors at different distances from the centre of rotation of the sample, and exposing these either simultaneously (many detectors are semi-transparent to hard X-rays) or at different times.

A 3DXRD microscope is installed at the Materials Science beamline of the ESRF.

== Software ==
To determine the crystallographic orientation of the grains in the considered sample, the following software packages are in use: Fable and GrainSpotter. Reconstructing the 3D shape of the grains is nontrivial and three approaches are available to do so, respectively based on simple back-projection, forward projection, algebraic reconstruction technique and Monte Carlo method-based reconstruction.

== Applications ==
With 3DXRD, it is possible to study in situ the time evolution of materials under different conditions. Among others, the technique has been used to map the elastic strains and stresses in a pre-strained nickel-titanium wire.

== Related techniques ==
The scientists involved in developing 3DXRD contributed to the development of three other three-dimensional non-destructive techniques for the material sciences, respectively using electrons and neutrons as a probe: three-dimensional orientation mapping in the transmission electron microscope (3D-OMiTEM), time-of-flight 3D neutron diffraction for multigrain crystallography (ToF 3DND) and laue 3D neutron diffraction (Laue3DND).

Using a system of lenses, the synchrotron technique dark-field X-ray microscopy (DFXRM) extends the capabilities of 3DXRD, allowing to focus on a deeply embedded single grain and to reconstruct its 3D structure and its crystalline properties. DFXRM is under development at the European Synchrotron Research Facility (ESRF), beamline ID06.

In a laboratory setting, 3D grain maps using X-rays as a probe can be obtained using laboratory diffraction contrast tomography (LabDCT), a technique derived from 3DXRD.

== See also ==
- Diffraction
- X-ray diffraction computed tomography (XRD-CT)
- Synchrotron
