= X-ray diffraction computed tomography =

Particle data acquisition technique

X-ray diffraction computed tomography is an experimental technique that combines X-ray diffraction with the computed tomography data acquisition approach. X-ray diffraction (XRD) computed tomography (CT) was first introduced in 1987 by Harding et al. using a laboratory diffractometer and a monochromatic X-ray pencil beam. The first implementation of the technique at synchrotron facilities was performed in 1998 by Kleuker et al.

X-ray diffraction computed tomography can be divided into two main categories depending on how the XRD data are being treated, specifically the XRD data can be treated either as powder diffraction or single crystal diffraction data and this depends on the sample properties. If the sample contains small and randomly oriented crystals, then it generates smooth powder diffraction "rings" when using a 2D area detector. If the sample contains large crystals, then it generates "spotty" 2D diffraction patterns. The latter can be performed using also a letterbox, cone and parallel X-ray beam and yields 2D or 3D images corresponding to maps of the crystallites or "grains" present in the sample and their properties, such as stress or strain. There exist several variations of this approach including 3DXRD, X-ray diffraction contrast tomography (DCT) and high energy X-ray diffraction microscopy (HEDM)

X-ray diffraction computed tomography, often abbreviated as XRD-CT, typically refers to the technique invented by Harding et al. which assumes that the acquired data are powder diffraction data. For this reason, it has also been mentioned as powder diffraction computed tomography and diffraction scattering computed tomography (DSCT), however they both refer to the same method.

== Data acquisition ==
XRD-CT employs a monochromatic pencil beam scanning approach and captures the diffraction signal in transmission geometry, producing a diffraction projection dataset. In this setup, the sample moves along an axis perpendicular to the beam's direction. It is illuminated with a monochromatic finely collimated or focused "pencil" X-ray beam. A 2D area detector then records the scattered X-rays, optimizing for best counting statistics and speed. Typically, the translational scan's size surpasses the sample's diameter, ensuring its full coverage at all assessed angles. The size of the translation step is commonly aligned with the X-ray beam's horizontal size. In a perfect scenario for any pencil-beam scanning tomographic method, the measured angles should match the number of translation steps multiplied by π/2, adhering to the Nyquist sampling theorem. However, this number can often be reduced in practice be equal to the number of translation steps without substantially compromising the quality of reconstructed images. The usual angular range spans from 0 to π.

== Data reconstruction ==
In most studies, the predominant data reconstruction approach is the 'reverse analysis' introduced by Bleuet et al. where each sinogram is treated independently yielding a new CT image. Most often the filtered back projection reconstruction algorithm is employed to reconstruct the XRD-CT images. The outcome is an image in which every pixel, or more accurately voxel, equates to a local diffraction pattern. The reconstructed data can also be seen as a stack of 2D square images, where each image corresponds to an X-ray scattering angle.

== Reconstruction artefacts ==
XRD-CT makes the following assumptions:

- The sample is small and there are no significant parallax artefacts in the acquired diffraction data; when this assumption is not valid the reconstructed patterns contain a wide range of artefacts, such as inaccurate peak positions, peak shapes and even artificial peak splitting
- The acquired XRD data are powder diffraction-like and do not contain spotty data
- The sample is not strongly absorbing the X-rays and there are no significant self-absorption problems in the acquired data
- The chemistry of the sample is not changing significantly during the XRD-CT scan

In practise, one or more of these assumptions are not valid and the data suffer from artefacts. There are strategies to remove or significantly all of these artefacts:

- Rather than employing the filtered back projection reconstruction algorithm to reconstruct the XRD-CT images, it is possible to use another reconstruction approach, termed "Direct Least Squares Reconstruction" (DLSR) to perform simultaneously peak fitting and tomographic reconstruction which takes into account the geometry of the experimental setup and yields parallax artefact-free reconstructed images. Performing a 0 to 2π XRD-CT scan instead of 0 to π can lead to reconstructed patterns with accurate peak position but not peak shape.
- Spotty 2D XRD data acquired during the XRD-CT scan lead to streak or line artefacts in the reconstructed XRD-CT data; it is possible to remove or suppress these artefacts by applying filters during the azimuthal integration of the raw 2D diffraction patterns
- The data can be corrected for self-absorption artefacts using an X-ray absorption-contrast CT scan of the same sample.
- If the solid-state chemistry of the sample is changing during the XRD-CT scan, then other data acquisition approaches can be employed that can improve the temporal resolution of the method, such as the interlaced approach

== Data analysis ==
Analyzing the local diffraction patterns can range from basic single-peak sequential batch fitting to a comprehensive one-step full-profile analysis, known as 'Rietveld-CT' (Wragg et al., 2015). The latter method stands out for its efficiency over the typical sequential method since it shares global parameters across all local models. Examples of these parameters include zero error and instrumental broadening, which enhance the refinement process's stability. To elaborate, each voxel in the restructured images is made up of a local model (like multi-phase scale factors, lattice parameters, and crystallite sizes) tailored to match the corresponding local diffraction pattern. This implies that only the overarching parameters are consistent across local models. However, the application of Rietveld-CT has been limited to small images, specifically those of 60 × 60 voxels, with the feasibility for larger images hinging on the computer memory available. Most often though full profile analysis of the local diffraction patterns is performed on a pixel-by-pixel or line-by-line basis using conventional XRD data analysis methods, such LeBail, Pawley and Rietveld. All these methods employ fitting based on the restructured diffraction patterns. Another approach which is also computational expensive is the DLSR which performs the tomographic data reconstruction and peak fitting in a single step. Regardless of the chosen analytical method, the final output comprises images filled with localized physico-chemical information. Each physico-chemical image corresponds to the refined parameters present in the local models, which might include maps that correspond to scale factors, lattice parameters, and crystallite sizes.

== See also ==
- X-ray diffraction
- computed tomography
- powder diffraction
- 3DXRD
- synchrotron
