= IMOD (software) =

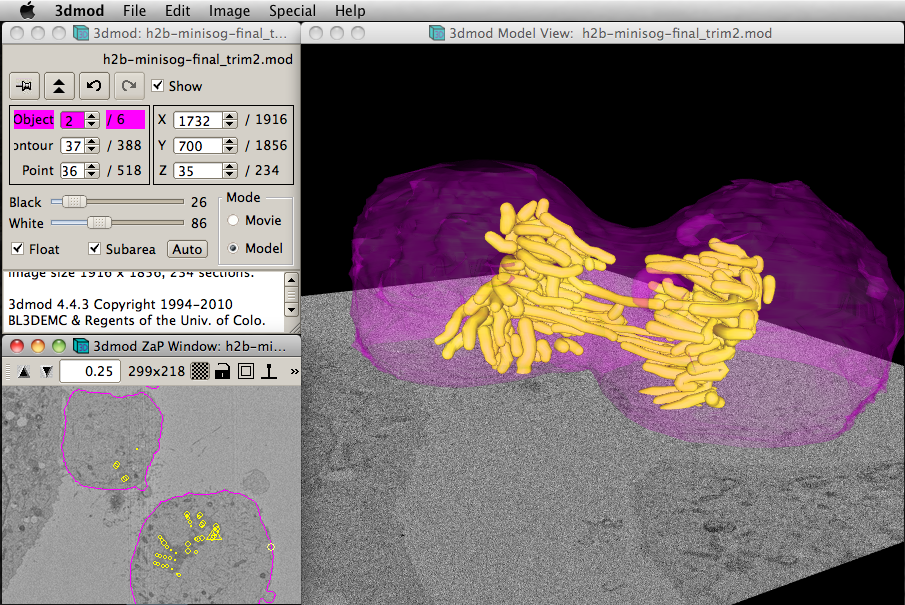
- IMOD's 3dmod GUI showing a separating cell.
- Developer(s): David Mastronarde et al. at the University of Colorado
- Stable release: 4.9.10 / September 26, 2018; 6 years ago
- Repository: bio3d.colorado.edu/imod/nightlyBuilds
- Operating system: Windows, Mac OS X, Linux
- Type: Electron microscopy
- License: GPLv2
- Website: bio3d.colorado.edu/imod

IMOD is an open-source, cross-platform suite of modeling, display and image processing programs used for 3D reconstruction and modeling of microscopy images with a special emphasis on electron microscopy data. IMOD has been used across a range of scales from macromolecule structures to organelles to whole cells and can also be used for optical sections. IMOD includes tools for image reconstruction, image segmentation, 3D mesh modeling and analysis of 2D and 3D data.

IMOD was developed at the Boulder Laboratory for 3-D Electron Microscopy of Cells. IMOD was first released in 1995, is free to download and use for any purpose.

== Main programs ==
IMOD includes over 180 command line programs listed here and three main GUI programs:

- 3dmod - IMOD's main GUI used to view and segment images and 3D vector models.
- Midas - A program used to align images over the top of each other, typically to apply fine adjustments after automatic cross-correlation.
- eTomo - A program used to reconstruct 3D volumes by joining smaller volumes and/or guiding the user through the process of tomographic reconstruction of single and dual axis tilt series. During this process eTomo make many program calls and often launches 3dmod and Midas to allow users to make fine adjustments.

== Supported file formats ==
Image Format: The main image format supported by IMOD is MRC file format, which typically have a ".st", ".mrc" or ".rec" extensions and represent various types of "image stacks" which together might represent a tilt series or 3D volume. IMOD will also open TIF files and includes a set of programs to convert between image formats including common microscopy formats like ".raw" and ".dm4". Vector Format: IMOD saves and opens vector data in the form of contour (polygons) and meshes in an IMOD binary file format, typically with a ".mod" or ".fid" extension. These IMOD model files are typically over-laid over the top of an image file and can be used to annotate and segment regions of interest. Models can consists of one or more objects, where each object can contain closed, open or scattered point "contours" which are used to generate a 3D mesh.

== Main features ==
- Reconstruction:
  - Reconstruction of single and combined dual axis tilt-series using tomographic reconstruction techniques.
  - Automatic tracking and registration of fiducial particles to improve tilt-series alignment.
  - Ability to parallel process expensive tilt-series reconstruction across multiple machines.
  - Combining of montaged datasets.
  - Ability to align and then warp images using cross-correlation and the Midas GUI for manual alignment.
  - Ability to align and join multiple volumes such as serial sections.
  - Automated reconstruction and batch processing of tilt series.
- Image Viewing and Movie Making:
  - Viewing of large 3D images slice by slice within 3dmod interface.
  - The ability to view 3D images and models at arbitrary orientations using 3dmod's slicer window.
  - The ability to make high movies of 2D image slices and/or 3D mesh models.
- Image Processing:
  - IMOD suite includes several automatic segmentation programs.
  - 3dmod interface provides common filtering and edge detection algorithms.
  - Ability to break volume into chunks then rejoin for batch of parallel processing.
  - Automatic iso-surfacing using a threshold system.
  - Converting images to contours (vector form) and vice versa.
- Segmentation:
  - Allows manual tracing of regions of interest using closed contours, open contours (for tubes) and scattered pints (for spheres).
  - Provides a set of manual and semi-automatic drawing tools for rapid tracing and refinement of organelle boundaries.
  - Allows smart interpolation of contours across multiple slices via special interpolation interface.
  - Includes a plugin for stereology.
- Meshing
  - Rapidly generates contours into meshes for final movies and analysis
  - Allows several different meshing options for tubes and arbitrary meshes
  - Surface smoothing and generation of low res meshes for faster rendering
- Analysis
  - Analysis of model files for basic quantitative information such as: volume, number of surfaces, volume, surface area plus the diameter of spheres, and length of open contours.
  - Analysis of image density and generation of histograms.
  - A series of programs specifically for microtubule analysis.
  - Spatial analysis to determine the distribution and proximity of different surfaces.

== See also ==
- Transmission electron microscopy
- Image processing
- List of free and open-source software packages
- List of microscopy visualization systems
