= John's equation =

Ultrahyperbolic partial differential equation

John's equation is an ultrahyperbolic partial differential equation satisfied by the X-ray transform of a function. It is named after German-American mathematician Fritz John.

Given a function $f\colon\mathbb{R}^n \rightarrow \mathbb{R}$ with compact support the X-ray transform is the integral over all lines in $\R^n.$ We will parameterise the lines by pairs of points $x,y \in \R^n,$ $x \ne y$ on each line and define $u$ as the ray transform where

$$u(x,y) = \int\limits_{-\infty}^{\infty} f( x + t(y-x) ) dt.$$

Such functions $u$ are characterized by John's equations

$$\frac{\partial^2u}{\partial x_i \partial y_j} - \frac{\partial^2u}{\partial y_i \partial x_j}=0$$

which is proved by Fritz John for dimension three and by Kurusa for higher dimensions.

In three-dimensional x-ray computerized tomography John's equation can be solved to fill in missing data, for example where the data is obtained from a point source traversing a curve, typically a helix.

More generally an ultrahyperbolic partial differential equation (a term coined by Richard Courant) is a second order partial differential equation of the form

$$\sum\limits_{i,j=1}^{2n} a_{ij}\frac{\partial^2 u}{\partial x_i \partial x_j} +
\sum\limits_{i=1}^{2n} b_i\frac{\partial u}{\partial x_i} + cu =0$$

where $n \ge 2$, such that the quadratic form

$$\sum\limits_{i,j=1}^{2n} a_{ij} \xi_i \xi_j$$

can be reduced by a linear change of variables to the form

$$\sum\limits_{i=1}^{n}  \xi_i^2 - \sum\limits_{i=n+1}^{2n} \xi_i^2.$$

It is not possible to arbitrarily specify the value of the solution on a non-characteristic hypersurface. John's paper however does give examples of manifolds on which an arbitrary specification of u can be extended to a solution.
