= Lal Ded Memorial School =

- Lal Ded School
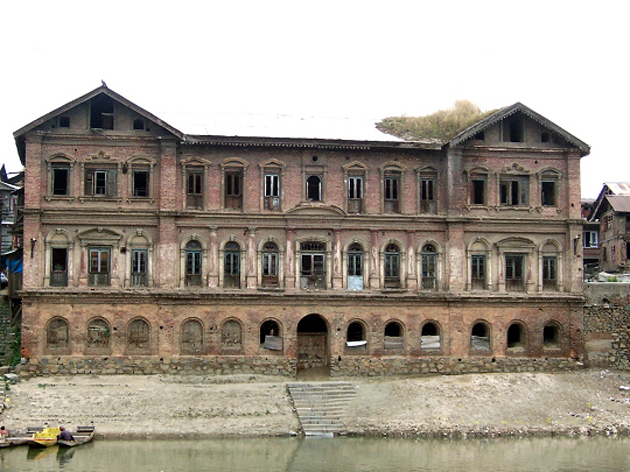

Location
- Badiyar-Bala, 2nd Bridge, Habba Kadal; Srinagar, Jammu and Kashmir, 190001

Information
- School type: Private
- Status: Active
- Gender: Co-Ed
- Classes: Class LKG – 10th
- Language: English
- Hours in school day: 5^{1}/_{2} Hr
- Classrooms: 50
- Sports: Cricket, athletics
- Affiliation: J & K Board of School Education

Lal Ded Memorial School is one of the oldest high schools in Srinagar, Jammu and Kashmir, India. It is located on the bank of the Jhelum River near the 2nd Bridge Habba Kadal. The school is named after the saint-poet Lalleshwari, commonly known as Lal Ded, and was built in the colonial style with the use of local techniques, especially Kashmir wooden crafts. It was considered part of the architectural heritage of Kashmir.

== Houses ==
The student body is divided into four houses, represented by colours. Each student is assigned to one of these houses upon entry into school. The houses are:

- Green
- Pink
- Yellow
- Sky blue

The houses compete against each other in academic and sporting disciplines, each contributing towards house points. The house with the most points is declared the House of the Year.

== The School and its Demolition ==
The building had an enormous ceiling, The design was rich in culture and was depicting royalty. It had wide stairs with split ways at the stair rests, leading to the 1st floor. The building had a basement which was a gateway to the river transport. In the times when the major mode of transportation was water, the basement was used as a bank to transport people and material for the building. In early eighties and nineties there was a huge rush of students every day near the banks of the river Jhelum and the boatmen were earning a good fortune by ferrying the students. There were prominent teachers who were well reputed and served the community while teaching in this school. Those include Ms. Haleema, Ms Ram Dulari, Ms. Shameema, Ms Ruvaida, Mr. Makhan Lal etc. The last known Principal of the Lal Ded Memorial School Was Sir Makhan Lal Bhat. The school was famous for its studies and mostly the students belonging to middle class and lower than that studied there. The school provided communal harmony and equal opportunity was provided despite caste and creed. The building was demolished in April 2009 by a private builder in order to construct a shopping complex at the site. A stay order was issued by the High Court after the building was demolished. The school has been transferred to a much smaller building in the area.

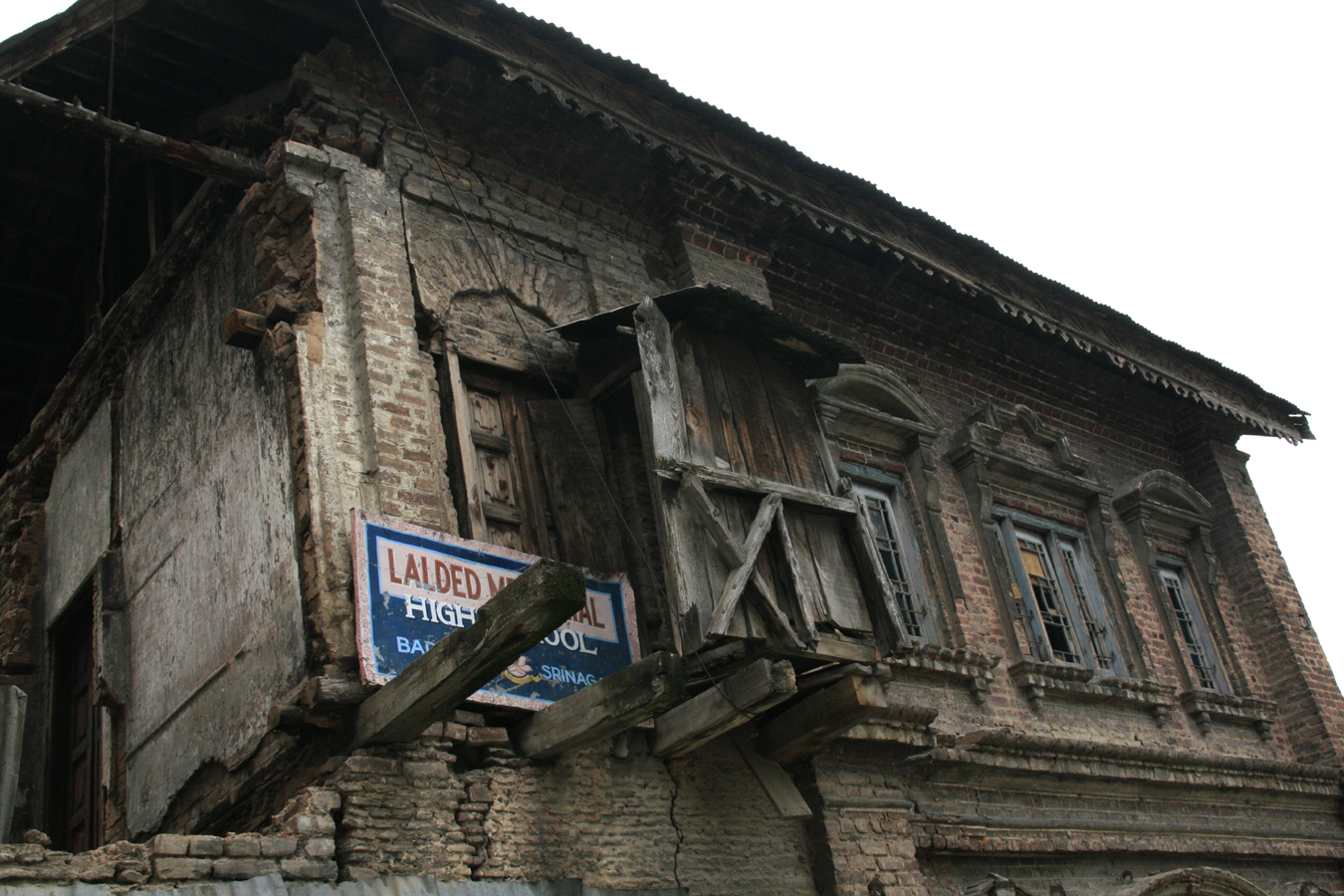
View of damaged part
