= Jaishree Odin =

Post-modern literary theorist

Jaishree Odin is a literary scholar who is the director and a professor of the Program of Interdisciplinary Studies at the University of Hawaiʻi. Her research relates to cultural studies of science and technology, literary and political ecology, ecology and ethics, system's ecology, and eco-literacy. Her work ranges from German philosophy and the feminist angle to mysticism. She has also considered the current relevance of Shaivite theories of higher consciousness.

Jaishree is sister of computer scientists Avinash Kak and Subhash Kak.

== Education and career ==
Odin obtained a Master of Science degree in chemistry from India, following which she went on to earn a doctorate in comparative literature from the State University of New York at Stony Brook.

Odin teaches in the Liberal Studies program at the University of Hawaii. Besides, she is the director of a Sloan foundation-funded online distance learning project at the university, which is intended to increase access to higher education in the state of Hawaii.

== Works ==
=== Translations ===
She is one of the translators of Lalleshvari, the famed 14th century Kashmiri mystic and poet. She has also translated Kashmir's early Sufi poetry, especially that of Nunda Reshi. Odin's essays have been published in Commonwealth Studies and in the collection Postcolonialism and American Ethnicity.

=== Electronic literature ===
Odin wrote To the Other Shore: Lalla's Life and Poetry (Vitasta Pub, 1999).

Odin's work includes Through the Looking Glass: Technology, Nomadology and Postmodern Narrative which the Electronic Literature State of the Arts Symposium describes as a critical exploration of shattered visual metaphors in contemporary literature which includes electronic literary forms.

Odin has written extensively on technology-mediated narrative forms as well as the role of technology in re-visioning higher education. Some of her published articles on electronic literature have dealt with the potential of the electronic media in depicting contemporary experience in multiple ways. Ponzanesi and Koen claim: "As Jaishree Odin has so aptly written, both the hypertext and the postcolonial are discourses are characterized by multivocality, multilinearity, open-endedness, active encounter and traversal. Both disrupt chronological sequences and spatial ordering (1997), allowing for a contestation of master narratives and the creation of subaltern positioning."

Odin's work includes critical exploration of shattered visual metaphors in contemporary literature

== Awards ==
For her work, she has been awarded various awards and grants, including a Fulbright Research Fellowship, the Alfred Sloan Foundation award and University of Hawaiʻi Relations Research Award.

== Bibliography ==
- Computers and Cultural Transformation. University of Hawaiʻi at Mānoa (1997).
- "The Edge of Difference: Negotiations Between the Hypertextual and the Postcolonial ". MFS Modern Fiction Studies 3 (43): 1997. Pages 598–630
- Globalization and Higher Education. Mānoa: University of Hawaiʻi (2004). ISBN 0-8248-2826-7
- Hypertext and the Female Imaginary. Minneapolis: University of Minnesota Press (2010). ISBN 0-8166-6670-9
- To the other shore: Lalla's life and poetry. Hillsboro Beach: Vitasta (1999). ISBN 81-86588-06-X
- Mystical Verses of Lalla. Delhi: Motilal Banarsidass (2009). ISBN 9788120832558
- Lalla to Nuruddin: Rishi-Sufi Poetry of Kashmir. Delhi: Motilal Banarsidass (2013). ISBN 9788120836907
