= Ultrahyperbolic equation =

Class of partial differential equations

In the mathematical field of differential equations, the ultrahyperbolic equation is a class of partial differential equation (PDE) first described by R. Courant. Specifically non-normal hyperbolic they are used for an unknown scalar function u of 2n variables x_{1}, ..., x_{n}, y_{1}, ..., y_{n} of the form

$$\frac{\partial^2 u}{\partial x_1^2} + \cdots + \frac{\partial^2 u}{\partial x_n^2} - \frac{\partial^2 u}{\partial y_1^2} - \cdots - \frac{\partial^2 u}{\partial y_n^2} = 0.$$

More generally, if a is any quadratic form in 2n variables with signature (n, n), then any PDE whose principal part is $a_{ij}u_{x_ix_j}$ is said to be ultrahyperbolic. Any such equation can be put in the form above by means of a change of variables.

The ultrahyperbolic equation has been studied from a number of viewpoints. On the one hand, it resembles the classical wave equation. This has led to a number of developments concerning its characteristics, one of which is due to Fritz John: the John equation.

In 2008, Walter Craig and Steven Weinstein proved that under a nonlocal constraint, the initial value problem is well-posed for initial data given on a codimension-one hypersurface. And later, in 2022, a research team at the University of Michigan extended the conditions for solving ultrahyperbolic wave equations to complex-time (kime), demonstrated space-kime dynamics, and showed data science applications using tensor-based linear modeling of functional magnetic resonance imaging data.

The equation has also been studied from the point of view of symmetric spaces, and elliptic differential operators. In particular, the ultrahyperbolic equation satisfies an analog of the mean value theorem for harmonic functions.
