= Fritz John =

German-American mathematician (1910–1994)

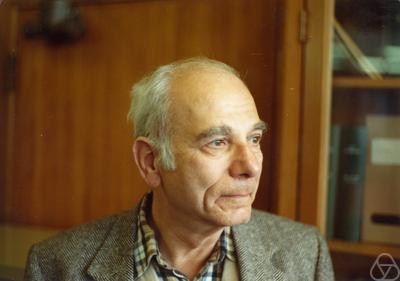
- Born: 14 June 1910; Berlin, Germany
- Died: 10 February 1994 (aged 83); New York City, United States
- Education: University of Göttingen
- Known for: John-Nirenberg Inequality; John's equation John ellipsoid
- Awards: Birkhoff Prize (1973); Steele Prize (1982)
- Scientific career
- Fields: Mathematics
- Workplaces: University of Kentucky; Ballistic Research Laboratory; New York University
- Doctoral students: Clifford Gardner; Sergiu Klainerman

Fritz John (14 June 1910 – 10 February 1994) was a German-born mathematician specialising in partial differential equations and ill-posed problems. His early work was on the Radon transform and he is remembered for John's equation. He was a 1984 MacArthur Fellow.

== Life and career ==
John was born in Berlin, Imperial Germany, the son of Hedwig (née Bürgel) and Hermann Jacobson-John. He studied mathematics from 1929 to 1933 in Göttingen where he was influenced by Richard Courant, among others. Following Hitler's rise to power in 1933 "non-aryans" were being expelled from teaching posts, and John, being half Jewish, emigrated from Germany to England.

John published his first paper in 1934 on Morse theory. He was awarded his doctorate in 1934 with a thesis entitled Determining a function from its integrals over certain manifolds from Göttingen. With Richard Courant's assistance he spent a year at St John's College, Cambridge. During this time he published papers on the Radon transform, a theme to which he would return throughout his career.

John was appointed an assistant professor at the University of Kentucky in 1935 and he emigrated to the United States, becoming naturalised in 1941. He stayed at Kentucky until 1946, apart from between 1943 and 1945, during which he did war service for the Ballistic Research Laboratory at the Aberdeen Proving Ground in Maryland. In 1946 he moved to New York University, where he remained for the rest of his career.

Throughout the 1940s and 1950s he continued to work on the Radon transform, in particular its application to linear partial differential equations, convex geometry, and the mathematical theory of water waves. He also worked in numerical analysis and on ill-posed problems. His textbook on partial differential equations was highly influential and was re-edited many times. He made several contributions to convex geometry, including his famous result that within every convex body there is one unique ellipsoid of maximal volume, now called the John Ellipsoid.

From the mid-1950s on, he started working on the theory of equilibrium nonlinear elasticity. He coauthored with Richard Courant the two-volume work Introduction to Calculus and Analysis, first published in 1965. He retired in 1981, but continued to work on nonlinear waves.

=== Honors ===
He received many awards during his career including the Birkhoff Prize in Applied Mathematics in 1973 and the Steele Prize in 1982. On 5 May 1985, jointly with Olga Arsenievna Oleinik, he was awarded the laurea honoris causa in mathematics by the Sapienza University of Rome.

== Publications ==
All John's published works, excluding monographs and textbooks, are collected in references (John 1985) and (John 1985a) with remarks and corrections by himself and commentaries by Sigurdur Helgason, Lars Hörmander, Sergiu Klainerman, Warner T. Koiter, Heinz-Otto Kreiss, Harold W. Kuhn, Peter Lax, Louis Nirenberg and Fritz Ursell.

- John, Fritz (1955), Plane waves and spherical means applied to partial differential equations, Interscience Tracts in Pure and Applied Mathematics, vol. 2 (1st ed.), New York: Interscience Publishers, pp. VIII+172, MR 0075429, Zbl 0067.32101. John's famous monograph on the Radon transform and its application to partial differential equations.
- John, Fritz (1982), Partial Differential Equations (4th ed.), New York: Springer-Verlag, ISBN 0-387-90609-6.
- John, Fritz (1985), Moser, Jürgen (ed.), Collected Papers. Volume 1, Contemporary Mathematicians (in English and German), Boston – Basel – Stuttgart: Birkhäuser Verlag, p. 648, ISBN 0-8176-3266-2, MR 0809786, Zbl 0584.01025.
- John, Fritz (1985a), Moser, Jürgen (ed.), Collected Papers. Volume 2, Contemporary Mathematicians (in English and German), Boston – Basel – Stuttgart: Birkhäuser Verlag, p. 758, ISBN 0-8176-3267-0, MR 0809787, Zbl 0584.01025.

== See also ==
- Bounded mean oscillation
- Fritz John conditions
- John ellipsoid
- John transform
