= Simultaneous algebraic reconstruction technique =

Algorithm in computerised tomography

Simultaneous algebraic reconstruction technique (SART) is a computerized tomography (CT) imaging algorithm useful in cases when the projection data is limited; it was proposed by Anders Andersen and Avinash Kak in 1984. It generates a good reconstruction in just one iteration and it is superior to standard algebraic reconstruction technique (ART).

As a measure of its popularity, researchers have proposed various extensions to SART: OS-SART, FA-SART, VW-OS-SART, SARTF, etc. Researchers have also studied how SART can best be implemented on different parallel processing architectures. SART and its proposed extensions are used in emission CT in nuclear medicine, dynamic CT, and holographic tomography, and other reconstruction applications. Convergence of the SART algorithm was theoretically established in 2004 by Jiang and Wang. Further convergence analysis was done by Yan.

An application of SART to ionosphere was presented by Hobiger et al. Their method does not use matrix algebra and therefore it can be implemented in a low-level programming language. Its convergence speed is significantly higher than that of classical SART. A discrete version of SART called DART was developed by Batenburg and Sijbers.
