= Tomviz =

tomviz.com
- Release: 2014; 12 years ago
- Stable release: 1.10.0
- Operating system: Linux; Mac OS X; Microsoft Windows
- Available in: English
- License: BSD 3 Clauses
- Website: www.tomviz.org
- Repository: github.com/OpenChemistry/tomviz

tomviz is an open source software platform for reproducible volumetric visualization and data processing. The platform is designed for a wide range scientific applications but is especially tailored to high-resolution electron tomography, with features that allow alignment and reconstruction of nanoscale materials. The tomviz platform allows graphical analysis of 3D datasets, but also comes packaged with Python, NumPy, and SciPy tools to allow advanced data processing and analysis. Current version is 1.10.0.

In 2022 the tomviz platform was used to enable 3D visualization of specimens during an electron or cryo-electron tomography experiment. Tomviz is built with multi-threaded data analysis pipeline runs dynamic visualizations that update as new data is collected or reconstruction algorithms proceed. Scientists can interactively analyse 3D specimen structure concurrent with a tomographic reconstruction after or during an experiment.

Volumetric visualization of nanocubes from researchers at Cornell University. The nanoscale reconstruction was visualized by the tomviz 3D analysis platform.
