= Crowther criterion =

The conventional method to evaluate the resolution of a tomography reconstruction is determined by the Crowther criterion. The minimum number of views, $m$, to reconstruct a particle of diameter $D$ to a resolution of $d$ is given by

$$m = \pi \frac{D}{d},$$

where $d = 1/R$, with $R$ the reciprocal space radius corresponding to the maximum meaningfully filled frequency in Fourier space.
