= Algebraic reconstruction technique =

Technique in computed tomography

Animated sequence of reconstruction steps, one iteration.

The algebraic reconstruction technique (ART) is an iterative reconstruction technique used in computed tomography. It reconstructs an image from a series of angular projections (a sinogram). Gordon, Bender and Herman first showed its use in image reconstruction; whereas the method is known as Kaczmarz method in numerical linear algebra.

An advantage of ART over other reconstruction methods (such as filtered backprojection) is that it is relatively easy to incorporate prior knowledge into the reconstruction process.

ART can be considered as an iterative solver of a system of linear equations $A x = b$, where:

$A$ is a sparse $m \times n$ matrix whose values represent the relative contribution of each output pixel to different points in the sinogram ($m$ being the number of individual values in the sinogram, and $n$ being the number of output pixels);

$x$ represents the pixels in the generated (output) image, arranged as a vector, and:

$b$ is a vector representing the sinogram. Each projection (row) in the sinogram is made up of a number of discrete values, arranged along the transverse axis. $b$ is made up of all of these values, from each of the individual projections.

Given a real or complex matrix $A$ and a real or complex vector $b$, respectively, the method computes an approximation of the solution of the linear systems of equations as in the following formula,

$$x^{k+1} = x^k + \lambda_k \frac{b_i - \langle a_i, x^k \rangle}{\|a_i\|^2} a_i^T$$

where $i = k \bmod m + 1$, $a_i$ is the i-th row of the matrix $A$, $b_i$ is the i-th component of the vector $b$.

$\lambda_k$ is an optional relaxation parameter, of the range $0 < \lambda_k \leq 1$. The relaxation parameter is used to slow the convergence of the system. This increases computation time, but can improve the signal-to-noise ratio of the output. In some implementations, the value of $\lambda_k$ is reduced with each successive iteration.

A further development of the ART algorithm is the simultaneous algebraic reconstruction technique (SART) algorithm.
