= Mediso =

Mediso Ltd
- Company type: Private
- Industry: Healthcare industry
- Predecessor: Gamma Works
- Founded: 1990; 35 years ago
- Headquarters: Budapest, Hungary
- Number of employees: 300+ (2025)
- Website: mediso.com

Mediso is a Hungarian manufacturer of nuclear medicine imaging equipment. Their range includes gamma cameras, PET scanners and software components, for clinical and preclinical imaging. The company was founded in 1990 and is headquartered in Budapest. Mediso is one of Hungary's largest outward foreign direct investors.

As well as manufacturing equipment, the company also operates two diagnostic nuclear medicine centres, in Debrecen and Budapest, representing two-thirds of Hungary's PET-CT capacity.

== History ==
The company began as a provider of servicing for the products of the state-owned Gamma Művek (Gamma Works) instrument maker, and started producing its own equipment in 1994. In 1998 it acquired the nuclear medicine assets of Gamma Works.

== Products ==
Mediso is unique amongst clinical diagnostic imaging manufacturers in offering a modular three-modality combined SPECT-PET-CT imaging system. This system was selected by the UK's metrology institute, the NPL, as the basis for its work in quantification of nuclear medicine.

The company is active in preclinical imaging, marketing a range of hybrid imaging systems in many combinations including PET-MR and SPECT-MR. Preclinical products were initially developed in collaboration with Bioscan, an American company, with Mediso as OEM, however following a dispute over payment and contract terms Bioscan was dissolved in 2013 and ongoing support for the products developed under the partnership fell to Mediso.
