= Preclinical imaging =

Visualization of living animals for research purposes

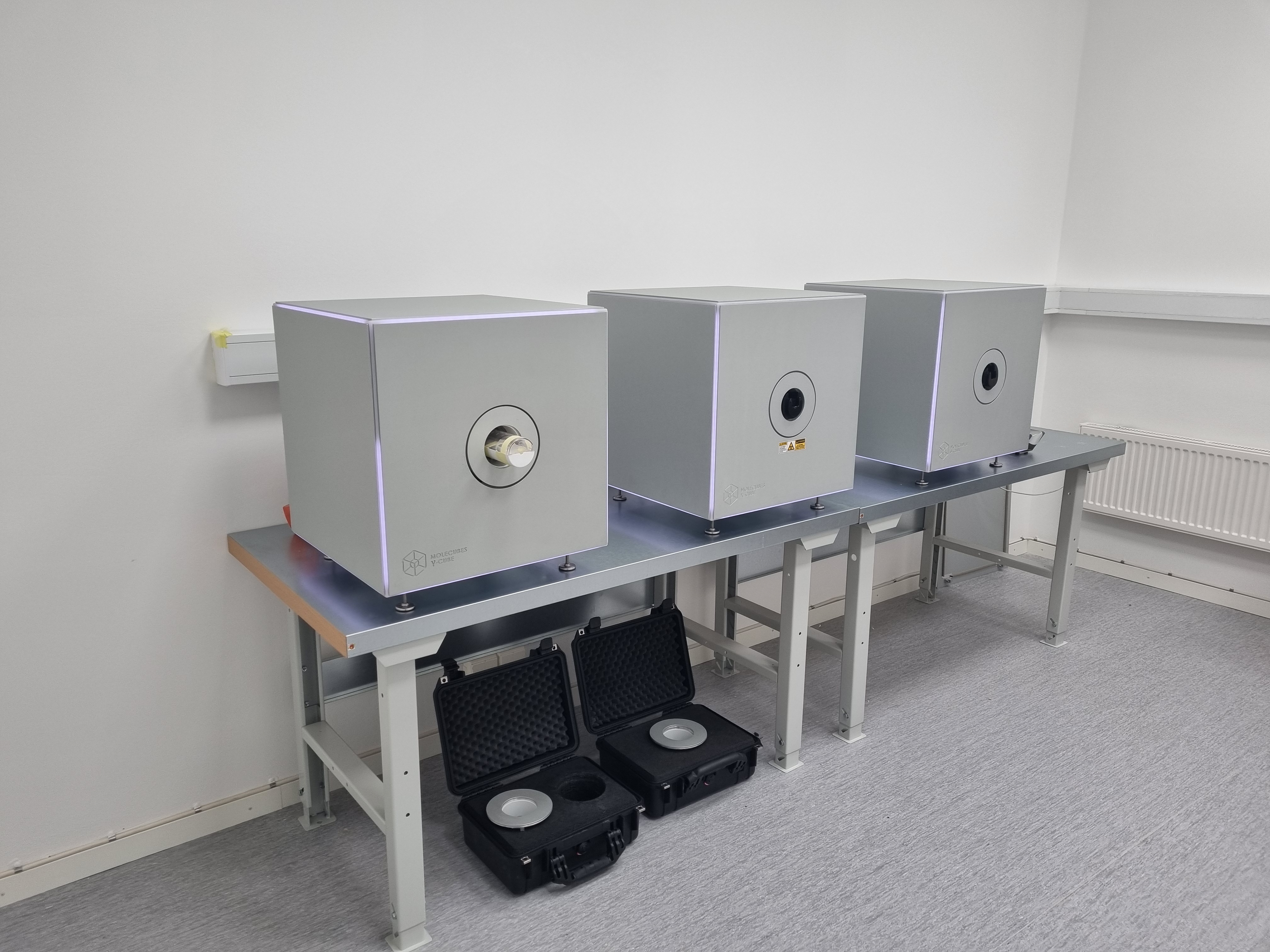
Desktopmodells of SPECT, uCT and PET for preclinical use.

Preclinical imaging is the visualization of living animals for research purposes, such as drug development. Imaging modalities have long been crucial to the researcher in observing changes, either at the organ, tissue, cell, or molecular level, in animals responding to physiological or environmental changes. Imaging modalities that are non-invasive and in vivo have become especially important to study animal models longitudinally. Broadly speaking, these imaging systems can be categorized into primarily morphological/anatomical and primarily molecular imaging techniques. Techniques such as high-frequency micro-ultrasound, magnetic resonance imaging (MRI) and computed tomography (CT) are usually used for anatomical imaging, while optical imaging (fluorescence and bioluminescence), positron emission tomography (PET), and single photon emission computed tomography (SPECT) are usually used for molecular visualizations.

These days, many manufacturers provide multi-modal systems combining the advantages of anatomical modalities such as CT and MR with the functional imaging of PET and SPECT. As in the clinical market, common combinations are SPECT/CT, PET/CT and PET/MR.

== Micro-ultrasound ==
Principle: High-frequency micro-ultrasound works through the generation of harmless sound waves from transducers into living systems. As the sound waves propagate through tissue, they are reflected back and picked up by the transducer, and can then be translated into 2D and 3D images. Micro-ultrasound is specifically developed for small animal research, with frequencies ranging from 15 MHz to 80 MHz.

Strengths: Micro-ultrasound is the only real-time imaging modality per se, capturing data at up to 1000 frames per second. This means that not only is it more than capable of visualizing blood flow in vivo, it can even be used to study high speed events such as blood flow and cardiac function in mice. Micro-ultrasound systems are portable, do not require any dedicated facilities, and is extremely cost-effective compared to other systems. It also does not run the risk of confounding results through side-effects of radiation. Currently, imaging of up to 30 μm is possible, allowing the visualization of tiny vasculature in cancer angiogenesis. To image capillaries, this resolution can be further increased to 3–5 μm with the injection of microbubble contrast agents. Furthermore, microbubbles can be conjugated to markers such as activated glycoprotein IIb/IIIa (GPIIb/IIIa) receptors on platelets and clots, α_{v}β_{3} integrin, as well as vascular endothelial growth factor receptors (VEGFR), in order to provide molecular visualization. Thus, it is capable of a wide range of applications that can only be achieved through dual imaging modalities such as micro-MRI/PET. Micro-ultrasound devices have unique properties pertaining to an ultrasound research interface, where users of these devices get access to raw data typically unavailable on most commercial ultrasound (micro and non-micro) systems.

Weaknesses: Unlike micro-MRI, micro-CT, micro-PET, and micro-SPECT, micro-ultrasound has a limited depth of penetration. As frequency increases (and so does resolution), maximum imaging depth decreases. Typically, micro-ultrasound can image tissue of around 3 cm below the skin, and this is more than sufficient for small animals such as mice. The performance of ultrasound imaging is often perceived as to be linked with the experience and skills of the operator. However, this is changing rapidly as systems are being designed into user-friendly devices that produce highly reproducible results. One other potential disadvantage of micro-ultrasound is that the targeted microbubble contrast agents cannot diffuse out of vasculature, even in tumors. However, this may actually be advantageous for applications such as tumor perfusion and angiogenesis imaging.

Cancer Research: The advances in micro-ultrasound has been able to aid cancer research in a plethora of ways. For example, researchers can easily quantify tumor size in two and three dimensions. Not only so, blood flow speed and direction can also be observed through ultrasound. Furthermore, micro-ultrasound can be used to detect and quantify cardiotoxicity in response to anti-tumor therapy, since it is the only imaging modality that has instantaneous image acquisition. Because of its real-time nature, micro-ultrasound can also guide micro-injections of drugs, stem cells, etc. into small animals without the need for surgical intervention. Contrast agents can be injected into the animal to perform real-time tumor perfusion and targeted molecular imaging and quantification of biomarkers. Recently, micro-ultrasound has even been shown to be an effective method of gene delivery.

=== Functional ultrasound brain imaging ===
Unlike conventional micro-ultrasound device with limited blood-flow sensitivity, dedicated real-time ultra fast ultrasound scanners with appropriate sequence and processing have been shown to be able to capture very subtle hemodynamic changes in the brain of small animals in real-time. This data can then be used to infer neuronal activity through the neurovascular coupling. The functional ultrasound imaging (fUS) technique can be seen as an analogue to functional magnetic resonance imaging (fMRI). fUS can be used for brain angiography, brain functional activity mapping, brain functional connectivity from mice to primates including awake animals.

== Micro-PAT ==
Principle: Photoacoustic tomography (PAT) works on the natural phenomenon of tissues to thermalelastically expand when stimulated with externally applied electromagnetic waves, such as short laser pulses. This causes ultrasound waves to be emitted from these tissues, which can then be captured by an ultrasound transducer. The thermoelastic expansion and the resulting ultrasound wave is dependent on the wavelength of light used. PAT allows for complete non-invasiveness when imaging the animal. This is especially important when working with brain tumor models, which are notoriously hard to study.

Strengths: Micro-PAT can be described as an imaging modality that is applicable in a wide variety of functions. It combines the high sensitivity of optical imaging with the high spatial resolution of ultrasound imaging. For this reason, it can not only image structure, but also separate between different tissue types, study hemodynamic responses, and even track molecular contrast agents conjugated to specific biological molecules. Furthermore, it is non-invasive and can be quickly performed, making it ideal for longitudinal studies of the same animal.

Weaknesses: Because micro-PAT is still limited by the penetrating strength of light and sound, it does not have unlimited depth of penetration. However, it is sufficient to pass through rat skull and image up to a few centimeters down, which is more than sufficient for most animal research. One other drawback of micro-PAT is that it relies on optical absorbance of tissue to receive feedback, and thus poorly vascularized tissue such as the prostate is difficult to visualize. To date, 3 commercially available systems are on the market, namely by VisualSonics, iThera and Endra, the last one being the only machine doing real 3D image acquisition.

Cancer research: The study of brain cancers has been significantly hampered by the lack of an easy imaging modality to study animals in vivo. To do so, a craniotomy is often needed, in addition to hours of anesthesia, mechanical ventilation, etc. which significantly alters experimental parameters. For this reason, many researchers have been content to sacrifice animals at different time points and study brain tissue with traditional histological methods. Compared to an in vivo longitudinal study, many more animals are needed to obtain significant results, and the sensitivity of the entire experiment is cast in doubt. As stated earlier, the problem is not reluctance by researchers to use in vivo imaging modalities, but rather a lack of suitable ones. For example, although optical imaging provides fast functional data and oxy- and deoxyhemoglobin analysis, it requires a craniotomy and only provides a few hundred micrometres of penetration depth. Furthermore, it is focused on one area of the brain, while research has made it apparently clear that brain function is interrelated as a whole. On the other hand, micro-fMRI is extremely expensive, and offers dismal resolution and image acquisition times when scanning the entire brain. It also provides little vasculature information. Micro-PAT has been demonstrated to be a significant enhancement over existing in vivo neuro-imaging devices. It is fast, non-invasive, and provides a plethora of data output. Micro-PAT can image the brain with high spatial resolution, detect molecular targeted contrast agents, simultaneously quantify functional parameters such as SO2 and HbT, and provide complementary information from functional and molecular imaging which would be extremely useful in tumor quantification and cell-centered therapeutic analysis.

== Micro-MRI ==
Principle: Magnetic resonance imaging (MRI) exploits the nuclear magnetic alignments of different atoms inside a magnetic field to generate images. MRI machines consist of large magnets that generate magnetic fields around the target of analysis. These magnetic fields cause atoms with non-zero spin quantum number such as hydrogen, gadolinium, and manganese to align themselves with the magnetic dipole along the magnetic field. A radio frequency (RF) signal is applied closely matching the Larmor precession frequency of the target nuclei, perturbing the nuclei's alignment with the magnetic field. After the RF pulse the nuclei relax and emit a characteristic RF signal, which is captured by the machine. With this data a computer will generate an image of the subject based on the resonance characteristics of different tissue types.

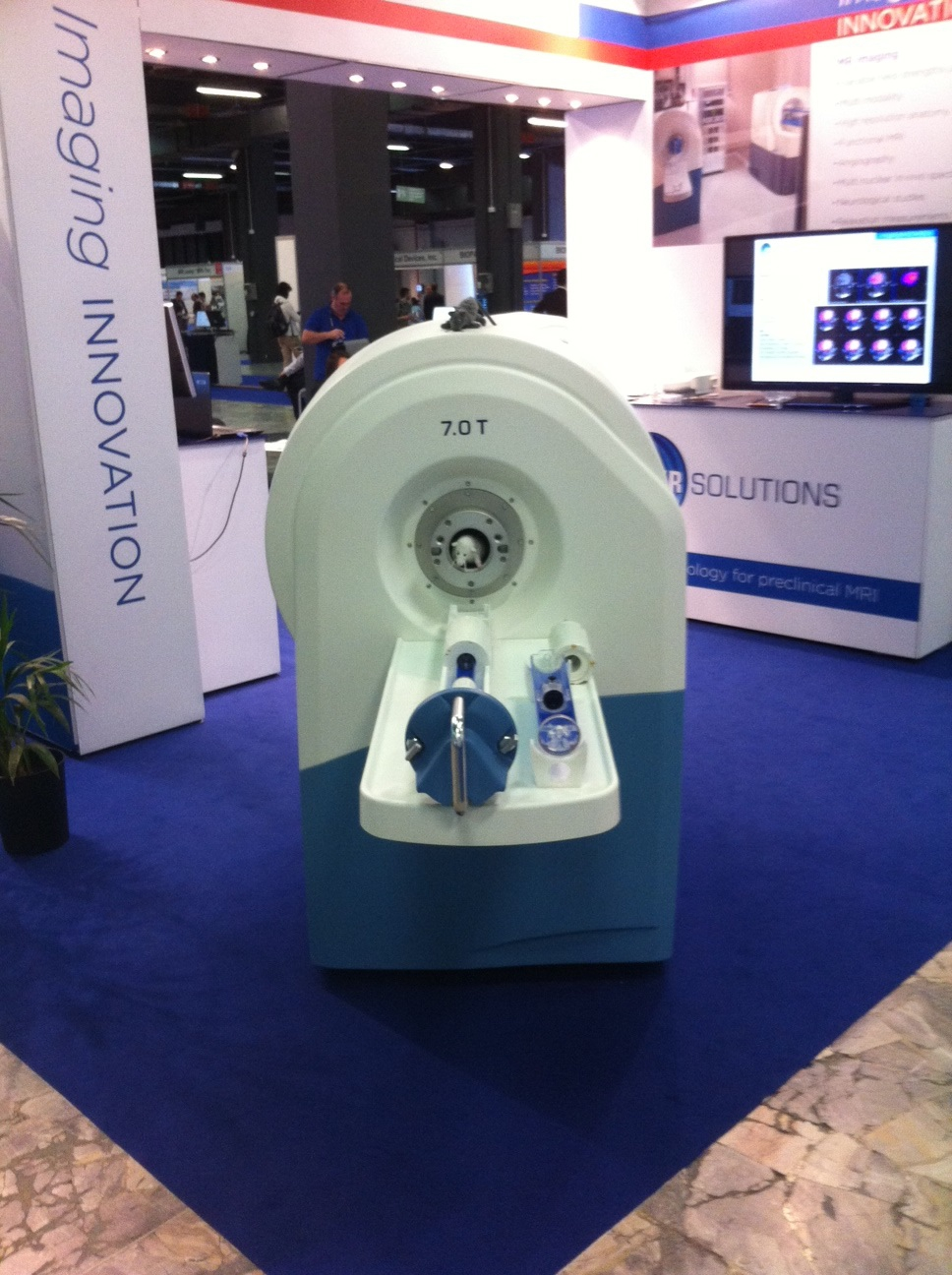
7T cryogen free preclinical MRI imaging system – this shows the MRS 7000 series

Since 2012, the use of cryogen-free magnet technology has greatly reduced infrastructure requirements and dependency on the availability of increasingly hard to obtain cryogenic coolants.

Strengths: The advantage of micro-MRI is that it has good spatial resolution, up to 100 μm and even 25 μm in very high strength magnetic fields. It also has excellent contrast resolution to distinguish between normal and pathological tissue. Micro-MRI can be used in a wide variety of applications, including anatomical, functional, and molecular imaging. Furthermore, since micro-MRI's mechanism is based on a magnetic field, it is much safer compared to radiation based imaging modalities such as micro-CT and micro-PET.

Weaknesses: One of the biggest drawbacks of micro-MRI is its cost. Depending on the magnetic strength (which determines resolution), systems used for animal imaging between 1.5 and 14 teslas in magnetic flux density range from $1 million to over $6 million, with most systems costing around $2 million. Furthermore, the image acquisition time is extremely long, spanning into minutes and even hours. This may negatively affect animals that are anesthetized for long periods of time. In addition, micro-MRI typically captures a snapshot of the subject in time, and thus it is unable to study blood flow and other real-time processes well. Even with recent advances in high strength functional micro-MRI, there is still around a 10–15 second lag time to reach peak signal intensity, making important information such as blood flow velocity quantification difficult to access.

Cancer research: Micro-MRI is often used to image the brain because of its ability to non-invasively penetrate the skull. Because of its high resolution, micro-MRI can also detect early small-sized tumors. Antibody-bound paramagnetic nanoparticles can also be used to increase resolution and to visualize molecular expression in the system.

Stroke and traumatic brain injury research: Micro-MRI is often used for anatomical imaging in stroke and traumatic brain injury research. Molecular imaging is a new area of research.

== Micro-CT ==
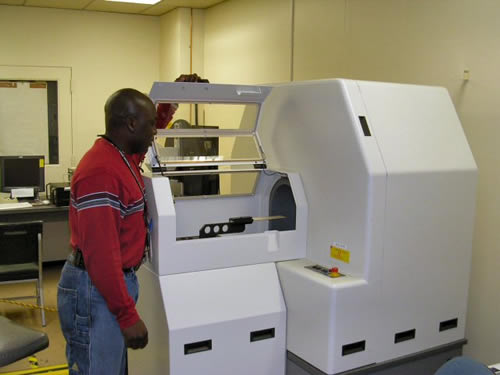
Micro-CT system

Volume rendering of reconstructed CT of a mouse skull

Principle: Computed tomography (CT) imaging works through X-rays that are emitted from a focused radiation source that is rotated around the test subject placed in the middle of the CT scanner. The X-ray is attenuated at different rates depending on the density of tissue it is passing through, and is then picked up by sensors on the opposite end of the CT scanner from the emission source. In contrast to traditional 2D X-ray, since the emission source in a CT scanner is rotated around the animal, a series of 2D images can then be combined into 3D structures by the computer.

Strengths: Micro-CT can have excellent spatial resolution, which can be up to 6 μm when combined with contrast agents. However, the radiation dose needed to achieve this resolution is lethal to small animals, and a 50 μm spatial resolution is a better representation of the limits of micro-CT. It is also decent in terms of image acquisition times, which can be in the range of minutes for small animals. In addition, micro-CT is excellent for bone imaging.

Weaknesses: One of the major drawbacks of micro-CT is the radiation dosage placed on test animals. Although this is generally not lethal, the radiation is high enough to affect the immune system and other biological pathways, which may ultimately change experimental outcomes. Also, radiation may affect tumor size in cancer models as it mimics radiotherapy, and thus extra control groups might be needed to account for this potential confounding variable. In addition, the contrast resolution of micro-CT is quite poor, and thus it is unsuitable for distinguishing between similar tissue types, such as normal vs. diseased tissues.

Cancer research: Micro-CT is most often used as an anatomical imaging system in animal research because of the benefits that were mentioned earlier. Contrast agents can also be injected to study blood flow. However, contrast agents for micro-CT, such as iodine, are difficult to conjugate molecular targets1 with, and thus it is rarely used in molecular imaging techniques. As such, micro-CT is often combined with micro-PET/SPECT for anatomical and molecular imaging in research.

== Micro-PET ==
Principle: Positron Emission Tomography (PET) images living systems by recording high-energy γ-rays emitted from within the subject. The source of the radiation comes from positron-emitting-bound biological molecules, such as 18F-FDG (fludeoxyglucose), which is injected into the test subject. As the radioisotopes decay, they emit positrons which annihilates with electrons found naturally in the body. This produces 2 γ-rays at ~180° apart, which are picked up by sensors on opposite ends of the PET machine. This allows individual emission events to be localized within the body, and the data set is reconstructed to produce images.

Strengths: The strength of micro-PET is that because the radiation source is within the animal, it has practically unlimited depth of imaging. The acquisition time is also reasonably fast, usually around minutes. Since different tissues have different rates of uptake radiolabelled molecular probes, micro-PET is also extremely sensitive to molecular details, and thus only nanograms of molecular probes are needed for imaging.

Weaknesses: Radioactive isotopes used in micro-PET have very short half-lives (110 min for 18F-FDG). In order to generate these isotopes, cyclotrons in radiochemistry laboratories are needed in close proximity of the micro-PET machines. Also, radiation may affect tumor size in cancer models as it mimics radiotherapy, and thus extra control groups might be needed to account for this potential confounding variable. Micro-PET also has poor spatial resolution of around 1 mm. In order to conduct a well rounded research that involves not only molecular imaging but also anatomical imaging, micro-PET needs to be used in conjunction with micro-MRI or micro-CT, which further decreases accessibility to many researchers because of high cost and specialized facilities.

Cancer research: PET is usually widely used in clinical oncology, and thus results from small animal research are easily translated. Because of the way 18F-FDG is metabolized by tissues, it results in intense radiolabelling in most cancers, such as brain and liver tumors. Almost any biological compound can be traced by micro-PET, as long as it can be conjugated to a radioisotope, which makes it suitable towards studying novel pathways.

== Micro-SPECT ==
High resolution ^{99m}Tc-MDP mouse SPECT scan: animated image of rotating maximum intensity projections.

Principle: Similar to PET, single photon emission computed tomography (SPECT) also images living systems through γ-rays emitted from within the subject. Unlike PET, the radioisotopes used in SPECT (such as technetium-99m) emit γ-rays directly, instead of from annihilation events of a positron and electron. These rays are then captured by a γ-camera rotated around the subject and subsequently rendered into images.

Strengths: The benefit of this approach is that the nuclear isotopes are much more readily available, cheaper, and have longer half-lives as compared to micro-PET isotopes. Like micro-PET, micro-SPECT also has very good sensitivity and only nanograms of molecular probes are needed. Furthermore, by using different energy radioisotopes conjugated to different molecular targets, micro-SPECT has the advantage over micro-PET in being able to image several molecular events simultaneously. At the same time, unlike micro-PET, micro-SPECT can reach very high spatial resolution by exploring pinhole collimation principle (Beekman et al.) In this approach, by placing the object (e.g. rodent) close to the aperture of the pinhole, one can reach high magnification of its projection on detector surface and effectively compensate for intrinsic resolution of the crystal.

Weaknesses: Micro-SPECT still has considerable radiation which may affect physiological and immunological pathways in the small animals. Also, radiation may affect tumor size in cancer models as it mimics radiotherapy, and thus extra control groups might be needed to account for this potential confounding variable. Micro-SPECT can also be up to two orders of magnitude less sensitive than PET. Furthermore, labeling compounds with micro-SPECT isotopes require chelating molarities which may alter their biochemical or physical properties.

Cancer research: Micro-SPECT is often used in cancer research for molecular imaging of cancer-specific ligands. It can also be used to image the brain because of its penetration power. Since newer radioisotopes involve nanoparticles such as 99mTC-labelled iron oxide nanoparticles, they could potentially be combined with drug delivery systems in the future.

The following small-animal SPECT systems have been developed in different groups and are available commercially:

Reference	Brand	System description	Radius of Rotation (cm)	Resolution (mm)	Sensitivity (cps/MBq)
Sajedi et al., 2014,	HiReSPECT	Pixelated CsI(Tl) crystals, LEHR parallel hole collimator, Rat and Mice imaging	25	1.7	36
Magota et al., 2011,	Inveon	NaI(Tl) crystals, 0.5mm single pinhole collimators	25	0.84	35.3
van der Have et al., 2009, Ivashchenko et al., 2015,	U-SPECT II	three stationary NaI(Tl) crystals, 75 pinholes in 5 rings, no multiplexing	NA	0.25 best	340 (0.25mm) 13000 best
Del Guerra et al., 2007,	X-SPECT	two rotating NaI(Tl) detectors, various apertures	NA	0.62 best	855

== Combined PET-MR ==
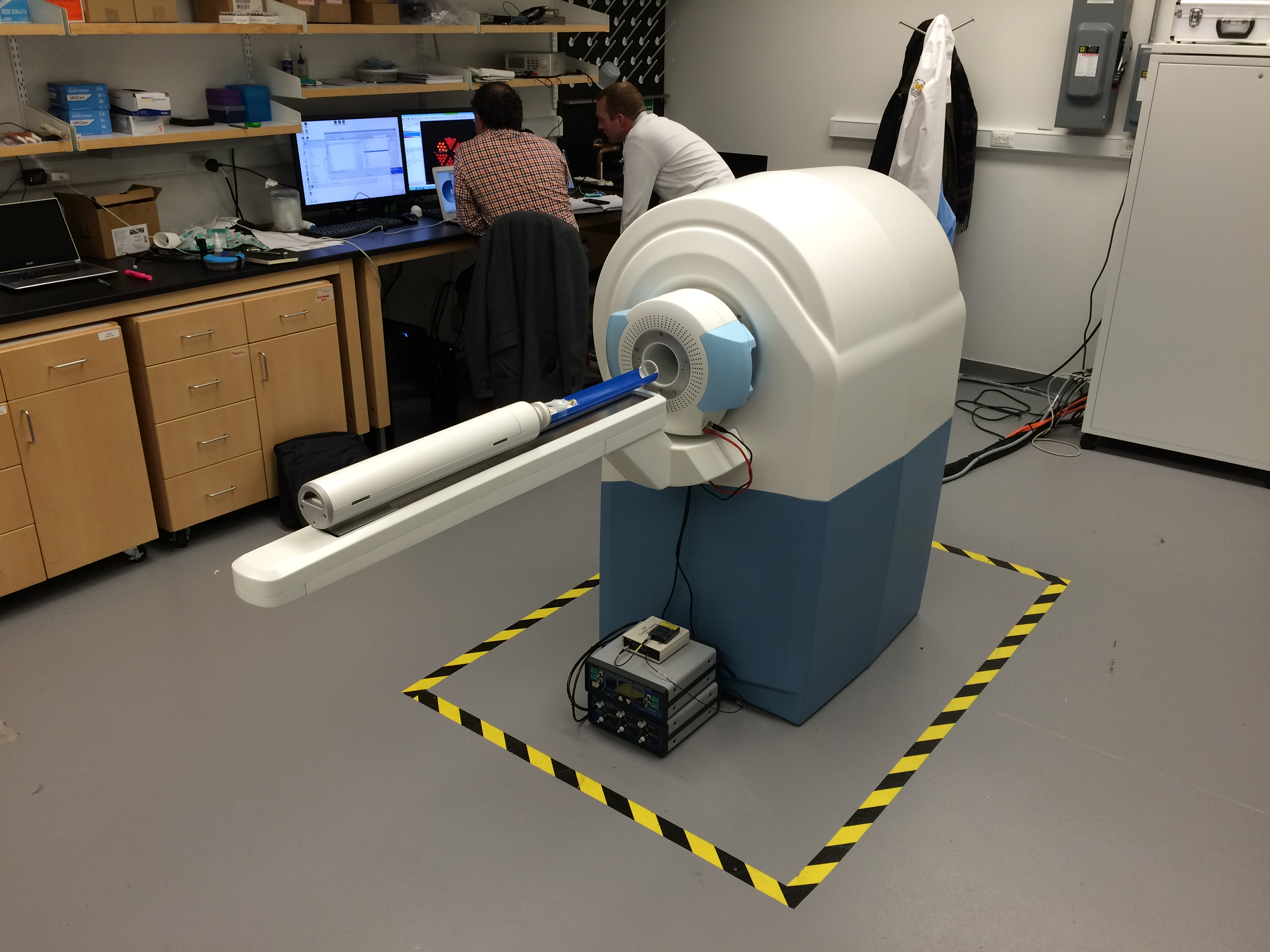
The image shows a 3T preclinical MRI multi-modality imaging system with a clip-on PET for sequential imaging.

Principle: The PET-MR technology for small animal imaging offers a major breakthrough in high performance functional imaging technology, particularly when combined with a cryogen-free MRI system. A PET-MR system provides superior soft tissue contrast and molecular imaging capability for great visualisation, quantification and translational studies. A PET-MR preclinical system can be used for simultaneous multi-modality imaging. Use of cryogen-free magnet technology also greatly reduces infrastructure requirements and dependency on the availability of increasingly hard to obtain cryogenic coolants.

Strengths: Researchers can use standalone PET or MRI operation, or use multi-modality imaging. PET and MRI techniques can be carried out either independently (using either the PET or MRI systems as standalone devices), or in sequence (with a clip-on PET) in front of the bore of the MRI system, or simultaneously (with the PET inserted inside the MRI magnet). This provides a much more accurate picture far more quickly. By operating the PET and MRI systems simultaneously workflow within a laboratory can be increased. The MR-PET system from MR Solutions incorporates the latest technology in Silicon Photomultipliers (SiPM), which significantly reduces the size of the system and avoids the problems of using photomultipliers or other legacy detector types within the magnetic field of the MRI. The performance characteristics of SiPM are similar to a conventional PMT, but with the practical advantages of solid-state technology.

Weaknesses: As this is a combination of imaging systems the weaknesses associated with each imaging modality are largely compensated for by the other. In sequential PET-MR, the operator needs to allow a little time to transfer the subject between the PET and MR acquisition positions. This is negated in simultaneous PET-MR. However, in sequential PET-MR systems, the PET ring itself is easy to clip-on or off and transfer between rooms for independent use. The researcher requires sufficient knowledge to interpret images and data from the two different systems and would require training for this.

Cancer research: The combination of MR and PET imaging is far more time efficient than using one technique at a time. Images from the two modalities may also be registered far more precisely, since the time delay between modalities is limited for sequential PET-MR systems, and effectively non-existent for simultaneous systems. This means that there is little to no opportunity for gross movement of the subject between acquisitions.

== Combined SPECT-MR ==
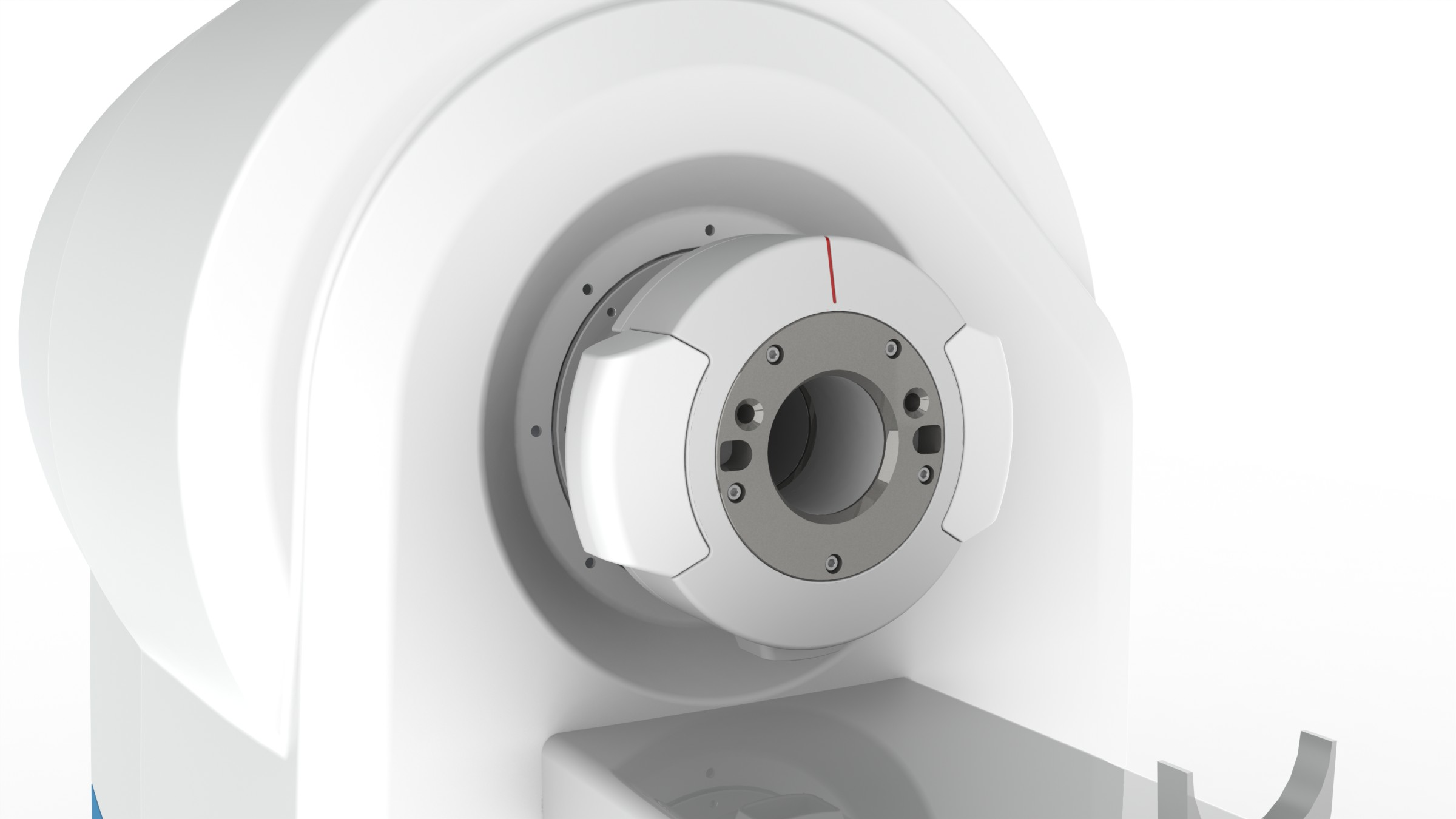
A preclinical imaging system with clip-on SPECT

Principle: The new SPECT-MR for small animal imaging is based on multi-pinhole technology, allowing high resolution and high sensitivity. When coupled with cryogen-free MRI the combined SPECT-MR technology dramatically increases the workflow in research laboratories whilst reducing laboratory infrastructure requirements and vulnerability to cryogen supply.

Strengths: Research facilities no longer need to purchase multiple systems and may choose between different system imaging configurations. The SPECT or MRI equipment can each be used as a standalone device on a bench, or sequential imaging can be carried out by clipping the SPECT module on to the MRI system. The animal translates automatically from one modality to the other along the same axis. By inserting a SPECT module inside the MRI magnet simultaneous acquisition of SPECT and MRI data is possible. The workflow of the laboratory can be increased by acquiring multiple modalities of the same subject in one session or by operating the SPECT and MRI systems separately, imaging different subjects at the same time. SPECT-MR is available in different configurations with different trans-axial field of views, allowing imaging from mice to rats.

Weaknesses: As this is a combination of imaging systems the weaknesses associated with one or other imaging modality are no longer applicable. In sequential SPECT-MR, the operator needs to allow a little time to transfer the subject between the SPECT and MR acquisition positions. This is negated in simultaneous SPECT-MR. However, for sequential SPECT-MR, when the SPECT module is clipped on it is easy to clip-on or off and transfer between rooms. The researcher has to have sufficient knowledge to interpret two different system outputs and would require training for this.

Cancer research: The combination of MRI, which is used as a non-invasive imaging technique, and SPECT provide results far more quickly when compared to using one technique at a time. Images from the two modalities may also be registered far more precisely, since the time delay between modalities is limited for sequential SPECT-MR systems, and effectively non-existent for simultaneous systems. This means that there is little to no opportunity for gross movement of the subject between acquisitions. With separate, independent operation of the MRI and SPECT systems workflow can easily be increased.

== Optical imaging ==
Principle: Optical imaging is divided into fluorescence and bioluminescence.

- Fluorescence imaging works on the basis of fluorochromes inside the subject that are excited by an external light source, and which emit light of a different wavelength in response. Traditional fluorochromes include GFP, RFP, and their many mutants. However significant challenges emerge in vivo due to the autofluorescence of tissue at wavelengths below 700 nm. This has led to a transition to near-infrared dyes and infrared fluorescent proteins (700 nm–800 nm) which have demonstrated much more feasibility for in vivo imaging due to the much lower autofluorescence of tissue and deeper tissue penetration at these wavelengths.
- Bioluminescence imaging, on the other hand, is based on light generated by chemiluminescent enzymatic reactions. In both fluorescence and bioluminescence imaging, the light signals are captured by charge-coupled device (CCD) cameras cooled up to −150 °C, making them extremely light-sensitive. In events where more light is produced, less sensitive cameras or even the naked eye can be used to visualize the image.

Strengths: Optical imaging is fast and easy to perform, and is relatively inexpensive compared to many of the other imaging modalities. Furthermore, it is extremely sensitive, being able to detect molecular events in the 10–15 M range. In addition, since bioluminescence imaging does not require excitation of the reporter, but rather the catalysis reaction itself, it is indicative of the biological / molecular process and has almost no background noise.

Weaknesses: A major weakness of optical imaging has been the depth of penetration, which, in the case of visible dyes is only a few millimeters. Near-infrared fluorescence has allowed depths of several centimeters to be feasible. Since light in the infrared region has the best penetration depth, numerous fluorochromes have been specifically designed to be optimally excited in this area. Optical imaging, fluorescence has a resolution limited to the diffraction of light of ~270 nm and bioluminescence has a resolution of ~1–10 mm, depending on time of acquisition, compared to MRI at 100 μm, and micro-ultrasound at 30 μm.

Cancer research: Because of poor depth of penetration, optical imaging is typically only used for molecular purposes, and not anatomical imaging. Due to poor depth of penetration in visible wavelengths, it is used for subcutaneous models of cancer, however near-infrared fluorescence has enabled orthotopic models to now be feasible. Often, investigation of specific protein expression in cancer and drug effects on these expressions are studied in vivo with genetically engineered light-emitting reporter genes. This also allows the identification of mechanisms for tissue-selective gene targeting in cancer and beyond.

== Combined PET-optical imaging, fluorescence ==
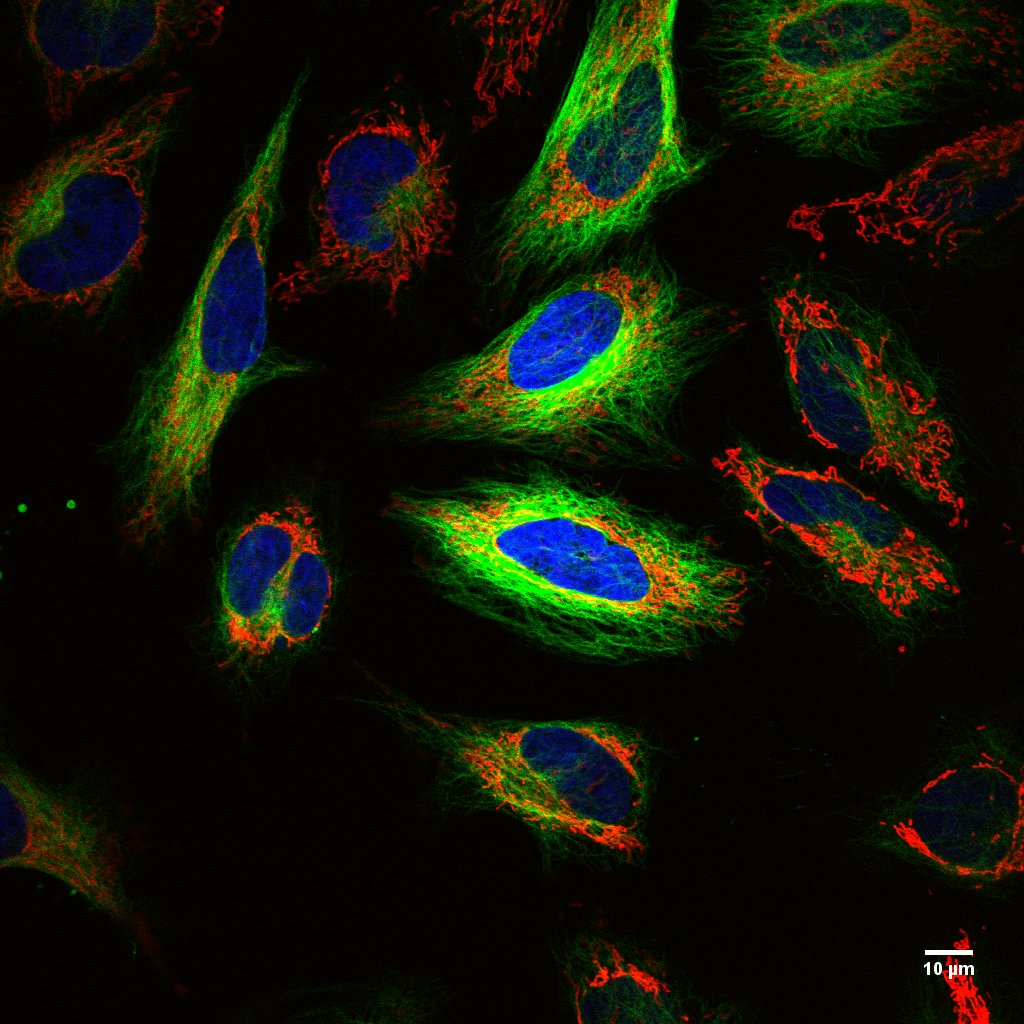
Multi-color fluorescence imaging of living HeLa cells with labelled mitochondria (red), actin (green), and nuclei (blue). Each cell is ~10 um and images show optical imaging allows for resolution ≤1 um.

Principle: Dioxaborolane chemistry enables radioactive fluoride (^{18}F) labeling of antibodies or red blood cells, which allows for positron emission tomography (PET) and fluorescence imaging of cancer and hemorrhages, respectively. A Human-Derived, Genetic, Positron-emitting and Fluorescent (HD-GPF) reporter system uses a human protein, PSMA and non-immunogenic, and a small molecule that is positron-emitting (boron bound ^{18}F) and fluorescent for dual modality PET and fluorescence imaging of genome modified cells, e.g. cancer, CRISPR/Cas9, or CAR T-cells, in an entire mouse. The combining of these imaging modalities was predicted by 2008 Nobel Laureate, Roger Y. Tsien, to compensate for the weaknesses of single imaging techniques.

Strengths: Combines the strengths of PET and optical Imaging, fluorescence. PET allows for anatomical imaging for location of labelled cells in entire animals or humans because the radiolabel, ^{18}F, is within the animal or human for nearly unlimited depth of penetration. ^{18}F has a half-life of 110 min and limits the radioactive exposure to the animal or human. Optical imaging allows for higher resolution with sub-cellular resolution of ~270 nm, or the diffraction limit of light, to allow for imaging of single cells and localizing cellular location on the cell membrane, endosomes, cytoplasm, or nuclei (see FIgure of multicolor HeLa cells). The technique can label small molecules, antibodies, cells (cancer and red blood cells), cerebrospinal fluid, hemorrhages, prostate cancer removal, and genome edited cells expressing a genetically encoded human protein, PSMA, for imaging CRISPR/Cas9 edited and CAR T-cells.

Weaknesses: Combining PET and optical imaging allows for two imaging agents that compensate for the weakness of the others. ^{18}F has a half-life of 110 min and the PET signal is not permanent. Fluorescent small molecules allow for permanent signal when stored in the dark and not photobleached. Currently, there is not a single instrument that can image the PET signal and image fluorescence with subcellular resolution (see Figure of multicolor HeLa cells). Multiple instruments are required to image PET, whole organ fluorescence, and single cell fluorescence with sub-cellular resolution.
