= Preclinical development =

Stage of drug development

In drug development, preclinical development (also termed preclinical studies or nonclinical studies) is a stage of research that begins before clinical trials (testing in humans) and during which important feasibility, iterative testing and drug safety data are collected, typically in laboratory animals.

The main goals of preclinical studies are to determine a starting, safe dose for first-in-human study and assess potential toxicity of the product, which typically include new medical devices, prescription drugs, and diagnostics.

Companies use stylized statistics to illustrate the risks in preclinical research, such as that on average, only one in every 5,000 compounds that enters drug discovery to the stage of preclinical development becomes an approved drug.

== Types ==
Each class of product may undergo different types of preclinical research. For instance, drugs may undergo pharmacodynamics (what the drug does to the body) (PD), pharmacokinetics (what the body does to the drug) (PK), ADME, and toxicology testing. This data allows researchers to allometrically estimate a safe starting dose of the drug for clinical trials in humans. Medical devices that do not have drug attached will not undergo these additional tests and may go directly to good laboratory practices (GLP) testing for safety of the device and its components. Some medical devices will also undergo biocompatibility testing which helps to show whether a component of the device or all components are sustainable in a living model. Most preclinical studies must adhere to GLPs in ICH Guidelines to be acceptable for submission to regulatory agencies such as the Food & Drug Administration in the United States.

Typically, both in vitro and in vivo tests will be performed. Studies of drug toxicity include which organs are targeted by that drug, as well as if there are any long-term carcinogenic effects or toxic effects causing illness.

== Animal testing ==
The information collected from these studies is vital so that safe human testing can begin. Typically, in drug development studies animal testing involves two species. The most commonly used models are murine and canine, although primate and porcine are also used.

=== Choice of species ===
The choice of species is based on which will give the best correlation to human trials. Differences in the gut, enzyme activity, circulatory system, or other considerations make certain models more appropriate based on the dosage form, site of activity, or noxious metabolites. For example, canines may not be good models for solid oral dosage forms because the characteristic carnivore intestine is underdeveloped compared to the omnivore's, and gastric emptying rates are increased. Also, rodents can not act as models for antibiotic drugs because the resulting alteration to their intestinal flora causes significant adverse effects. Depending on a drug's functional groups, it may be metabolized in similar or different ways between species, which will affect both efficacy and toxicology.

Medical device studies also use this basic premise. Most studies are performed in larger species such as dogs, pigs and sheep which allow for testing in a similar sized model as that of a human. In addition, some species are used for similarity in specific organs or organ system physiology (swine for dermatological and coronary stent studies; goats for mammary implant studies; dogs for gastric and cancer studies; etc.).

Importantly, the regulatory guidelines of FDA, EMA, and other similar international and regional authorities usually require safety testing in at least two mammalian species, including one non-rodent species, prior to human trials authorization.

=== Ethical issues ===
Animal testing in the research-based pharmaceutical industry has been reduced in recent years both for ethical and cost reasons. However, most research will still involve animal based testing for the need of similarity in anatomy and physiology that is required for diverse product development.

== No observable effect levels ==
Based on preclinical trials, no-observed-adverse-effect levels (NOAELs) on drugs are established, which are used to determine initial phase 1 clinical trial dosage levels on a mass API per mass patient basis. Generally a 1/100 uncertainty factor or "safety margin" is included to account for interspecies (1/10) and inter-individual (1/10) differences.

== See also ==
- Drug development
- Lists of investigational drugs
- Preclinical imaging
- Phases of clinical research
