= Preclinical SPECT =

High resolution ^{99m}Tc-MDP mouse scan acquired with a stationary SPECT system: animated image of rotating maximum intensity projections.

Preclinical or small-animal Single Photon Emission Computed Tomography (SPECT) is a radionuclide based molecular imaging modality for small laboratory animals (e.g. mice and rats). Although SPECT is a well-established imaging technique that is already for decades in use for clinical application, the limited resolution of clinical SPECT (~10 mm) stimulated the development of dedicated small animal SPECT systems with sub-mm resolution. Unlike in clinics, preclinical SPECT outperforms preclinical coincidence PET in terms of resolution (best spatial resolution of SPECT - 0.25mm, PET ≈ 1 mm ) and, at the same time, allows to perform fast dynamic imaging of animals (less than 15s time frames).

SPECT imaging requires administration of small quantities of γ-emitting radiolabeled molecules (commonly called "tracers") into the animal prior to the image acquisition. These tracers are biochemically designed in such a way that they accumulate at target locations in the body. The radiation emitted by the tracer molecules (single γ-photons) can be detected by gamma detectors and, after image reconstruction, results in a 3-dimensional image of the tracer distribution within the animal. Some key radioactive isotopes used in preclinical SPECT are ^{99m}Tc, ^{123}I, ^{125}I, ^{131}I, ^{111}In, ^{67}Ga and ^{201}Tl.

Preclinical SPECT plays an important role in multiple areas of translational research where SPECT can be used for non-invasive imaging of radiolabeled molecules, including antibodies, peptides, and nanoparticles. Among major areas of its applications are oncology, neurology, psychiatry, cardiology, orthopedics, pharmacology and internal medicine.

== Basic imaging principle of preclinical SPECT ==
Due to the small size of the imaged animals (a mouse is about 3000 times smaller than a human measured by weight and volume), it is essential to have a high spatial resolution and detection efficiency for the preclinical scanner.

=== Spatial resolution ===
Looking at spatial resolution first, if we want to see the same level of details relatively to e.g. the size of the organs in a mouse as we can see in a human, the spatial resolution of clinical SPECT needs to be improved by a factor of $\sqrt[3]{3000} \approx 15$ or higher. Such an obstacle forced scientists to look for a new imaging approach for preclinical SPECT that was found in exploiting the pinhole imaging principle.

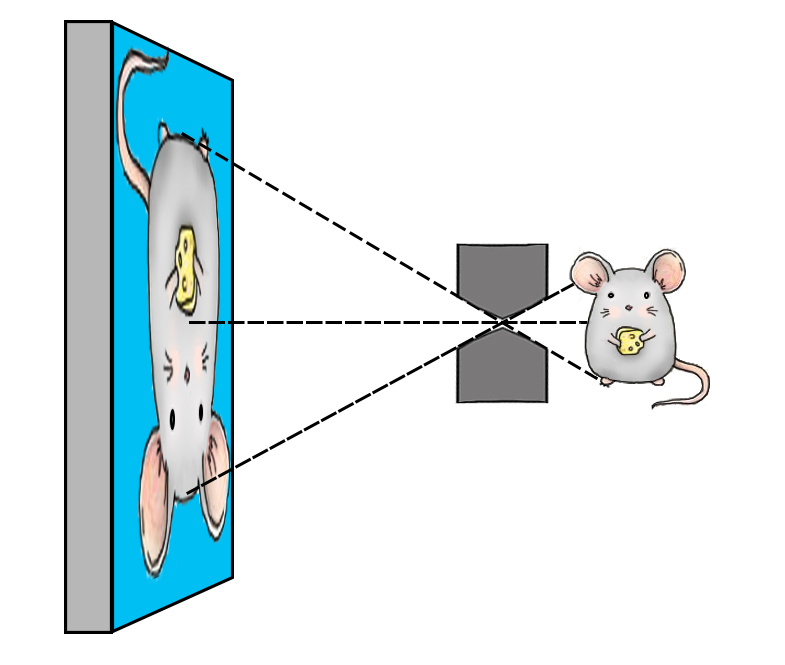
When pinhole imaging is used, the high magnification of the projection greatly reduces the resolution loss due to detector blurring

A pinhole collimator consists of a piece of dense material containing only a single hole, which typically has the shape of a double cone. First attempts to obtain SPECT images of rodents with a high resolution were based on use of pinhole collimators attached to convectional gamma cameras. In such a way, by placing the object (e.g. rodent) close to the aperture of the pinhole, one can reach a high magnification of its projection on the detector surface and effectively compensate for the limited intrinsic resolution of the detector.

The combined effects of the finite aperture size and the limited intrinsic resolution are described by:

$R= \sqrt{ { \left ({d_e \over M} \right ) ^2} + { \left ({R_i \over M} \right ) ^2}}$

d_{e} - effective pinhole diameter, R_{i} - intrinsic resolution of the detector, M – projection magnification factor.

The resolution of a SPECT system based on the pinhole imaging principle can be improved in one of three ways:

- by decreasing the effective diameter of the pinhole
- by increasing the magnification factor
- by using detectors with higher intrinsic resolution

The exact size, shape and material of the pinhole are important to obtain good imaging characteristics and is a subject of collimator design optimization studies via e.g. use of Monte Carlo simulations. Modern preclinical SPECT scanners based on pinhole imaging can reach up to 0.25 mm spatial or 0.015 μL volumetric resolution for in vivo mouse imaging.

=== Detection efficiency ===
Animated maximum intensity projections of SPECT/CT mouse scans acquired after administration of 0.26 MBq of ^{111}In-labelled nanoparticles. Images illustrates in vivo biodistribution of the particles within the animal.

The detection efficiency or sensitivity of a preclinical pinhole SPECT system is determined by:

$S = {{N {d_e}^2} \over {{16r_c}^2}}$

S – detection efficiency (sensitivity), d_{e}-effective pinhole diameter with penetration, N – total number of pinholes, r_{c} – collimator radius (e.g. object-to-pinhole distance).

The sensitivity can be improved by:

- increasing the pinhole diameter

Possible drawbacks: degradation of spatial resolution

- decreasing the object-to-pinhole distance (e.g. placing the animal as close as possible to the pinhole aperture)
- using multiple pinholes that simultaneously capture projections from multiple angles

Possible drawbacks: When multiple pinhole projections are projected on a single detector surface, they can either overlap each other (multiplexing projections) or be fully separated (non-overlapping projections). Although pinhole collimators with multiplexing projections allow reaching a higher sensitivity (by allowing to use a higher number of pinholes) when compared to non-overlapping designs, they also suffer from multiple artifacts in reconstructed SPECT images. The artifacts are cause by ambiguity about the origin of γ -photons detected in the areas of the overlap.

- decreasing the size of the "field-of-view"

Placing the animal close to the pinhole aperture comes at the cost of reducing the size of the area that can be imaged at a given time (the "field-of-view") compared to imaging at a lower magnification. However, when combined with moving the animal (the so-called "scanning-focus method") a larger area of interest can still be imaged with a good resolution and sensitivity.

The typical detection efficiency of preclinical SPECT scanner lies within a 0.1-0.2% (1000-2000 cps/MBq) range, which is more than tenfold higher than the average sensitivity of clinical scanners. At the same time, dedicated high-sensitivity collimators can allow >1% detection efficiency and maintain sub-mm image resolution.

=== System design ===
Multiple pinhole SPECT system designs have been proposed, including rotating gamma camera, stationary detector but rotating collimator, or completely stationary camera in which a large number of pinholes surround the animal and simultaneously acquire projections from a sufficient number of angles for tomographic image reconstruction. Stationary systems have several advantages over non-stationary systems:

- no need for repetitive system geometry recalibration

Why: due to the stable position of the detector(s) and the collimator

- unlike non-stationary systems, stationary systems are very well suited for dynamic SPECT imaging

Why: because all required angular information is acquired simultaneously by multiple pinholes.

Modern stationary preclinical SPECT systems can perform dynamic SPECT imaging with up to 15s time-frames during total body and up to 1s time-frames during "focused" (e.g. focusing on heart) image acquisitions.

Fast pharmacokinetics: 15s-frame ^{99m}Tc-MDP mouse SPECT scan acquired with a stationary SPECT system

=== Multimodality imaging ===
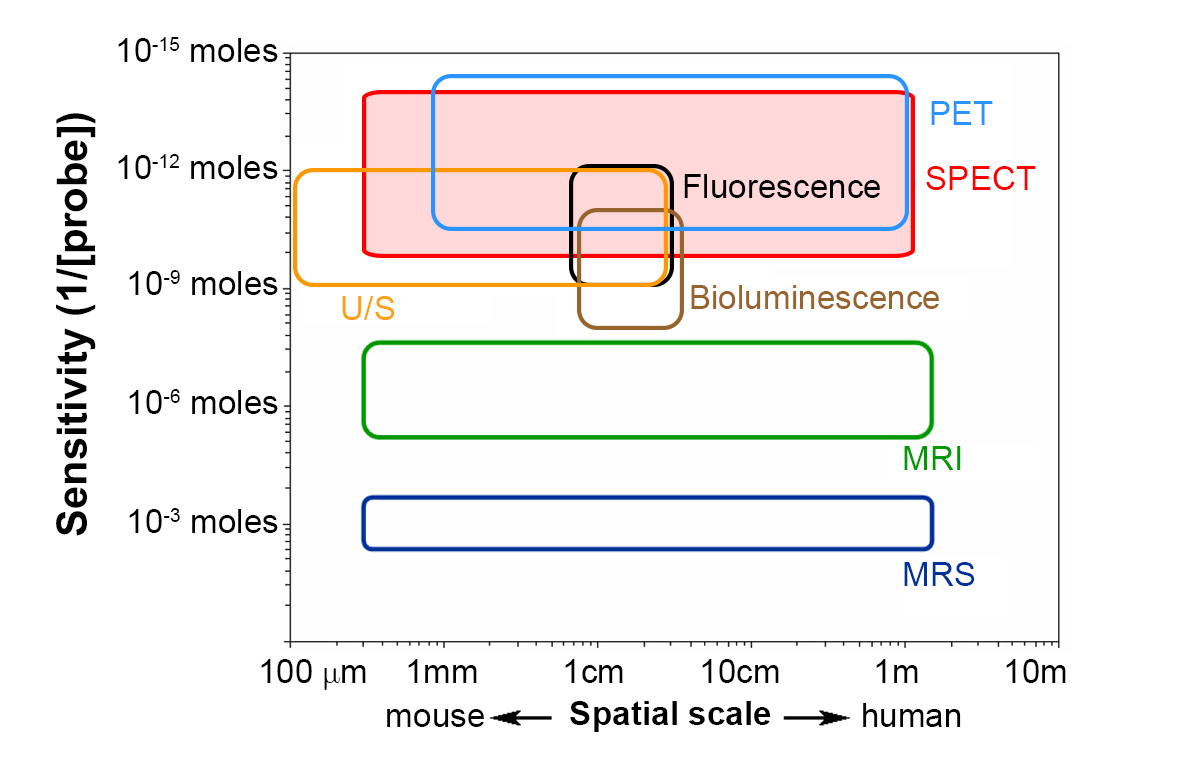
The matrix of medical imaging and comparative performance of different imaging modalities

Medical imaging encompasses many different imaging modalities, which can roughly be divided into anatomical and functional imaging. Anatomical modalities (e.g. CT, MRI) mainly reveal the structure of the tissues and organs, while the functional modalities (SPECT, PET and optical imaging) mainly visualize the physiology and function of the tissue. Because none of the existing imaging modalities can provide information on all aspects of structure and function, an obvious approach is to either alter one imaging modality to the task (e.g. special imaging sequences in MRI) or to try to image a subject using multiple imaging modalities. Following the multimodality approach, in recent years the combination of a SPECT/CT system became a standard molecular imaging modality combination in both the pre-clinical and clinical fields, where the structural information of CT complements the functional information from SPECT. Nevertheless, integration of SPECT with other imaging modalities (e.g. SPECT/MR, SPECT/PET/CT) is not uncommon.

== Reconstruction ==
A SPECT measurement consists of 2-dimensional projections of the radioactive source distribution that are obtained with collimator(s) and gamma-detector(s). It is the goal of an image reconstruction algorithm to accurately reconstruct the unknown 3-dimensional distribution of the radioactivity.

The Maximum Likelihood Expectation Maximization algorithm (MLEM) is an important "gold standard" in iterative image reconstruction of SPECT images, but it is also a computationally costly method. A popular solution of this obstacle is based on the use of so-called block-iterative reconstruction methods. With block-iterative methods, every iteration of the algorithm is subdivided into many subsequent sub-iterations, each using a different subset of the projection data. An example of a widely used block-iterative version of MLEM is the Ordered Subsets Expectation Maximization algorithm (OSEM). The reconstruction speedup of a full iteration OSEM over a single iteration MLEM is approximately equal to the number of subsets.

=== Quantification ===
Preclinical SPECT is a quantitative imaging modality. The uptake of SPECT tracers in organs (regions) of interest can be calculated from reconstructed images. The small size of laboratory animals diminishes the photon's attenuation in the body of the animal (compared to one in human-sized objects). Nevertheless, depending on the energy of γ-photons and the size of the animal that is used for imaging, correction for photon attenuation and scattering might be required to provide good quantification accuracy. A detailed discussion about effects affecting quantification of SPECT images can be found in Hwang et al.

== SPECT tracers ==
SPECT tracers emit single γ-photons with the energy of the emitted photon depending on the isotope that was used for radiolabeling of the tracer. Thus, in cases when different tracers are radiolabeled with isotopes of different energies, SPECT provides the ability to probe several molecular pathways simultaneously (multi-isotope imaging). Two examples of common multi-isotope tracer combinations used for SPECT imaging are ^{123}I-NaI/^{99m}Tc-pertechnetate (thyroid function) or ^{99m}Tc-MAG3/^{111}In-DTPA (assessment of renal filtration).

The time the tracer can be followed in vivo strongly depends on the half-life of the isotope used for radiolabeling of the compound. The wide range of relatively long-lived isotopes (compared to the isotopes typically used in PET) that can be used for SPECT imaging provide a unique possibility to image slow kinetic processes (days to weeks).

Another important characteristic of SPECT is the simplicity of tracer radiolabeling procedure that can be performed with a wide range of commercially available labelling kits.

== Preclinical SPECT versus PET ==
Preclinical SPECT and PET are two very similar molecular imaging modalities used for noninvasive visualization of biodistribution of radiolabel tracers that are injected into an animal. The major difference between SPECT and PET lies in the nature of the radioactive decay of their tracers. SPECT tracer emits single γ-photons with the energy of photons that depends on the isotope that was used for radiolabeling. In PET, the tracer emits positrons that, after annihilation with electrons in the subject, produce a pair of 511 keV annihilation photons emitted into opposite directions. Coincidental detection of these annihilation photons is used for image formation in PET. As a result, different detection principles have been developed for SPECT and PET tracers, which has led to separate SPECT and PET scanners.

Comparison of preclinical SPECT and PET is provided in the table below

Characteristics	SPECT	PET
Radiation decay	single γ-photons	β^{+} decay
Basic principle of detection	Collimation, single γ -photons	Coincidence detection, annihilation photons
Energy of γ-photons	Different for different isotopes	511 keV
Most popular isotope	^{99m}Tc: half-life 6.03 hours, γ-energy 141 keV	^{18}F: half-life 108 minutes, γ-energy 511 keV
Multi-isotope imaging	Yes, for isotopes with different γ-photon energy	No, all isotopes emit photons with 511 keV energy
Imaging slow dynamic processes	Yes, for isotope with longer half-life (e.g. ^{99m}Tc - 6.03 hours, ^{123}I - 13 hours, ^{111}In - 2.8 days, ^{125}I - 60.14 days)	Limited by decay of the isotope (half-life ^{18}F - 108 minutes, ^{11}C - 24 minutes, ^{124}I - 4.18 days)
Imaging fast dynamic processes	>15s frames (total body imaging) >1s frames (focused imaging)	Yes, seconds to minutes frames
Resolution, best	0.25 mm (0.015 μL)	0.75 mm (0.422 μL)
Detection efficiency	0.1-1.3%	1- 10%
Tracer radiolabeling (costs)	Low to high	High

== Modern preclinical SPECT ==
Manufacturers of preclinical SPECT systems include MILabs, Siemens, Bruker, Mediso and MOLECUBES. Systems are available combining SPECT with multiple other modalities including MR, PET and CT. They can achieve up to 0.25 mm spatial resolution (0.015 μL volumetric resolution) and up to 1 second-frame dynamic noninvasive SPECT imaging of rodents.

== Applications in translational research ==
SPECT can be used for diagnostic or therapeutic imaging. When a radioactive tracer is labeled with primary gamma-emitting isotopes (e.g. ^{99m}Tc, ^{123}I, ^{111}In, ^{125}I), the acquired images provide functional information about the bio-distribution of the compound that can be used for multiple diagnostic purposes. Examples of diagnostic applications: metabolism and perfusion imaging, cardiology, orthopedics.

When SPECT tracer is labeled with a combined gamma and α- or β-emitting isotope (e.g. ^{213}Bi or ^{131}I), it is possible to combine cancer radioisotope therapy with α- or β- particles with noninvasive imaging of response to the therapy that is achieved with SPECT.
