= Radiologists Without Borders =

Non-profit organization

RWB logo

Radiologists without Borders is a 401(c)(3) non-profit organization that delivers humanitarian aid to developing countries, in the form of radiological services and equipment. Radiologists without Borders was founded in 2008, by New York-based radiologist Tariq Gill. The organization is composed entirely of volunteers, and its mission statement is "to bring life saving diagnostic imaging solutions to medically underserved populations worldwide."

Radiologists without Borders began work in Haiti after the 2010 earthquake. They have provided an ultrasound to the City Hospital and provided training of medical personnel. The group worked with Muhimbili University of Health and Allied Sciences (MUHAS) and Muhimbili Hospital in 2010 and 2011 to research needs of the school and university. Radiologists without Borders arranged for training of medical personnel which took place at Lourdes Hospital in Binghamton, New York, has donated 2 mammography machines, and textbooks and computers for the school.

== See also ==
- Medical imaging
- Radiography
- Radiology
