= Ultrasound research interface =

An ultrasound research interface (URI) is a software tool loaded onto a diagnostic clinical ultrasound device which provides functionality beyond typical clinical modes of operation.

A normal clinical ultrasound user only has access to the ultrasound data in its final processed form, typically a B-Mode image, in DICOM format. For reasons of device usability they also have limited access to the processing parameters that can be modified.

A URI allows a researcher to achieve different results by either acquiring the image at various intervals through the processing chain, or changing the processing parameters.

== Typical B-mode receive processing chain ==
A typical digital ultrasound processing chain for B-Mode imaging may look as follows:

- Multiple analog signals are acquired from the ultrasound transducer (the transmitter/receiver applied to the patient)
- Analog signals may pass through one or more analog notch filters and a variable-gain amplifier (VCA)
- Multiple analog-to-digital converters convert the analog radio frequency (RF) signal to a digital RF signal sampled at a predetermined rate (typical ranges are from 20MHz to 160MHz) and at a predetermined number of bits (typical ranges are from 10 bits to 16 bits)
- Beamforming is applied to individual RF signals by applying time delays and summations as a function of time and transformed into a single RF signal
- The RF signal is run through one or more digital FIR or IIR filters to extract the most interesting parts of the signal given the clinical operation
- The filtered RF signal runs through an envelope detector and is log compressed into a grayscale format

Multiple signals processed in this way are lined up together and interpolated and rasterized into a readable image.

== Data access ==
A URI may provide data access at many different stages of the processing chain, these include:

- Pre-beamformed digital RF data from individual channels
- Beamformed RF data
- Envelope detected data
- Interpolated image data

Where many diagnostic ultrasound devices have Doppler imaging modes for measuring blood flow, the URI may also provide access to Doppler related signal data, which can include:

- Demodulated (I/Q) data
- FFT spectral data
- Autocorrelated velocity color Doppler data

== Tools ==
A URI may include many different tools for enabling the researcher to make better use of the device and the data captured, some of these tools include:

- Custom MATLAB programs for reading and processing signal and image data
- Software Development Kits (SDKs) for communicating with the URI, signal processing and other specialized modes of operation available on the URI
