= PET/MRI =

Positron emission tomography–magnetic resonance imaging
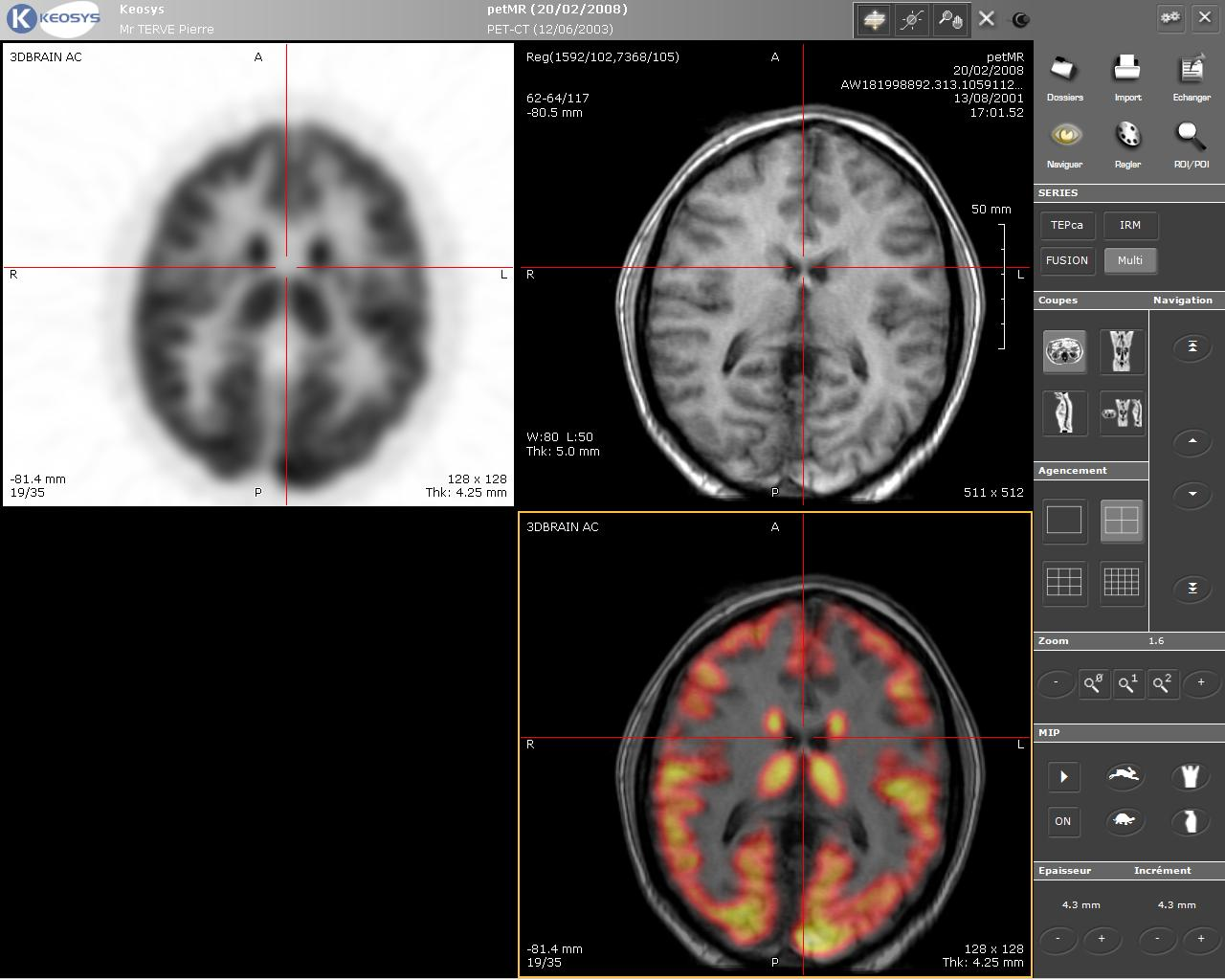
- Computer screenshot showing a PET image (upper left), an MRI image (upper right), and the combined PET/MRI image where PET data is overlaid over the MRI data (lower right)
- Purpose: Used in clinical field of oncology

Positron emission tomography–magnetic resonance imaging (PET/MRI, PET–MRI, or PET/MR) is a hybrid imaging technology that incorporates magnetic resonance imaging (MRI) soft tissue morphological imaging and positron emission tomography (PET) functional imaging.

The combination of PET and MRI was mentioned in a 1991 Phd thesis by R. Raylman. Simultaneous PET/MR detection was first demonstrated in 1997, however it took another 13 years, and new detector technologies, for clinical systems to become commercially available.

== Applications ==
Presently, the main clinical fields of PET/MRI are oncology, cardiology, neurology, and neuroscience. Research studies are actively conducted at the moment to understand benefits of the new PET/MRI diagnostic method. The technology combines the exquisite structural and functional characterization of tissue provided by MRI with the extreme sensitivity of PET imaging of metabolism and tracking of uniquely labeled cell types or cell receptors.

== Manufacturers ==
Several companies offer clinical and pre-clinical combined PET/MR system; clinical systems are available from United Imaging, Philips, Siemens, and GE. There are varying approaches to the combination of the two technologies. Some designs are essentially separate machines, in the same room, with a bed that can transfer a patient from one scanner to another. Fully integrated systems are the most technically challenging to achieve, but provide greatest benefits in terms of the ability to make simultaneous, exactly aligned, acquisitions.

=== Clinical systems ===
The first two clinical whole body PET/MRI systems were installed by Philips at Mount Sinai Hospital in the United States and at Geneva University Hospital in Switzerland, in 2010. The system featured a PET and MRI scanner separated by a revolving bed.

Siemens was the first company to offer simultaneous PET/MR acquisitions, with the first systems installed in 2010 based on avalanche photodiode detectors.

Currently Siemens and GE are the only companies to offer a fully integrated whole body and simultaneous acquisition PET/MRI system. The Siemens system (Biograph mMR) received a CE mark and FDA approval for customer purchase in 2011.

The GE system (SIGNA PET/MR) received its 510K & CE mark in 2014.

=== Preclinical systems ===
Currently, the combination of positron emission tomography (PET) and magnetic resonance imaging (MRI) as a hybrid imaging modality is receiving great attention not only in its emerging clinical applications but also in the preclinical field. Several designs based on several different types of PET detector technology have been developed in recent years, some of which have been used for first preclinical studies.

Several companies offer MR-compatible preclinical PET scanner inserts for use in the bore of an existing MRI, enabling simultaneous PET/MR image acquisition.

== Comparison with PET–CT ==
The combination of PET with X-ray computed tomography (CT) is the more established PET imaging technology. With both PET/CT and PET/MR the intended advantage is to combine functional imaging provided by PET, with structural (anatomical) information from CT or MRI. Although images from different modalities collected at different scanning sessions can be overlaid by image registration, a simultaneous acquisition offers better alignment of images and direct correlation. Combining imaging modalities in one single scanning session also has the advantage of reducing the number of appointments and therefore improving patient comfort.

The same clinical decisions that would influence the choice between stand-alone CT or MR imaging would also determine areas where PET/CT or PET/MR would be preferred. For example, one advantage of MRI compared to CT is its superior soft tissue contrast, while CT has the advantage of being much faster than MRI.

One clear advantage of PET/MR compared to PET/CT is the lower total ionising radiation dose obtained. For body PET/CT applications, the CT part of the examination constitutes approximately 60-80% of the radiation dose, with the remaining radiation dose originating from the PET radiopharmaceutical. In contrast, no ionising radiation dose is obtained from MRI. PET/MR is therefore appealing in children, in particularly for serial follow-up examinations as used in oncology or chronic inflammatory conditions.

=== Attenuation correction ===
PET/MRI systems don't offer a direct way to obtain attenuation maps, unlike stand-alone PET or PET/CT systems.

Stand-alone PET systems' attenuation correction (AC) is based on a transmission scan (μ-map) acquired using a ^{68}Ge (Germanium-68) rotating rod source, which directly measures photon attenuation at 511 keV. PET/CT systems use a low-dose CT scan for AC. Since X-rays have a range of energies lower than 511 keV, AC values are closely approximated from Hounsfield units.

There is no correlation between MR image intensity and electron intensity, therefore conversion of MR images into an attenuation map is difficult. This is an active area of research and a range of approaches have been developed. One method uses a Dixon MRI sequence and segments the resultant image into fat and water, with pre-set attenuation factors. Disadvantages of this method include a lack of bone attenuation and loss of the true continuous range of attenuation factors. Comparisons with PET/CT attenuation maps for oncology purposes however have shown that this is a usable technique. The Dixon method can be combined with ultrashort echo time (UTE) sequences to better identify bone and increase the possible classes of tissue for segmentation. More sequences increase MRI acquisition time and therefore the risk of motion artefacts.

In areas of the body with predictable structures (e.g. the head), segmentation (where tissue is categorised using the MRI image data), or atlas methods can be used. In atlas methods a standard MR image, with associated CT attenuation data, can be warped to fit the actual patient anatomy. Disadvantages of this method include difficulty with unusual anatomy, a need for a suitable library of images, and the need to account for MR coil attenuation. Synthetic, or substitute, CT (sCT) methods to generate CT-like data from MRI are also of interest for radiotherapy planning and have been primarily investigated for sites in the head. While some of these use an atlas technique, many take a voxel approach where actual voxel intensities (contrast data) are used in combination with machine learning (trained on MR/CT data) to assign electron density values.

In many of the above methods, MRI artifacts (e.g. from physiological motion) can affect attenuation correction accuracy.

== See also ==
- Neuroimaging
- Avalanche photodiode
- Silicon photomultiplier
