= PET–CT =

Medical imaging method

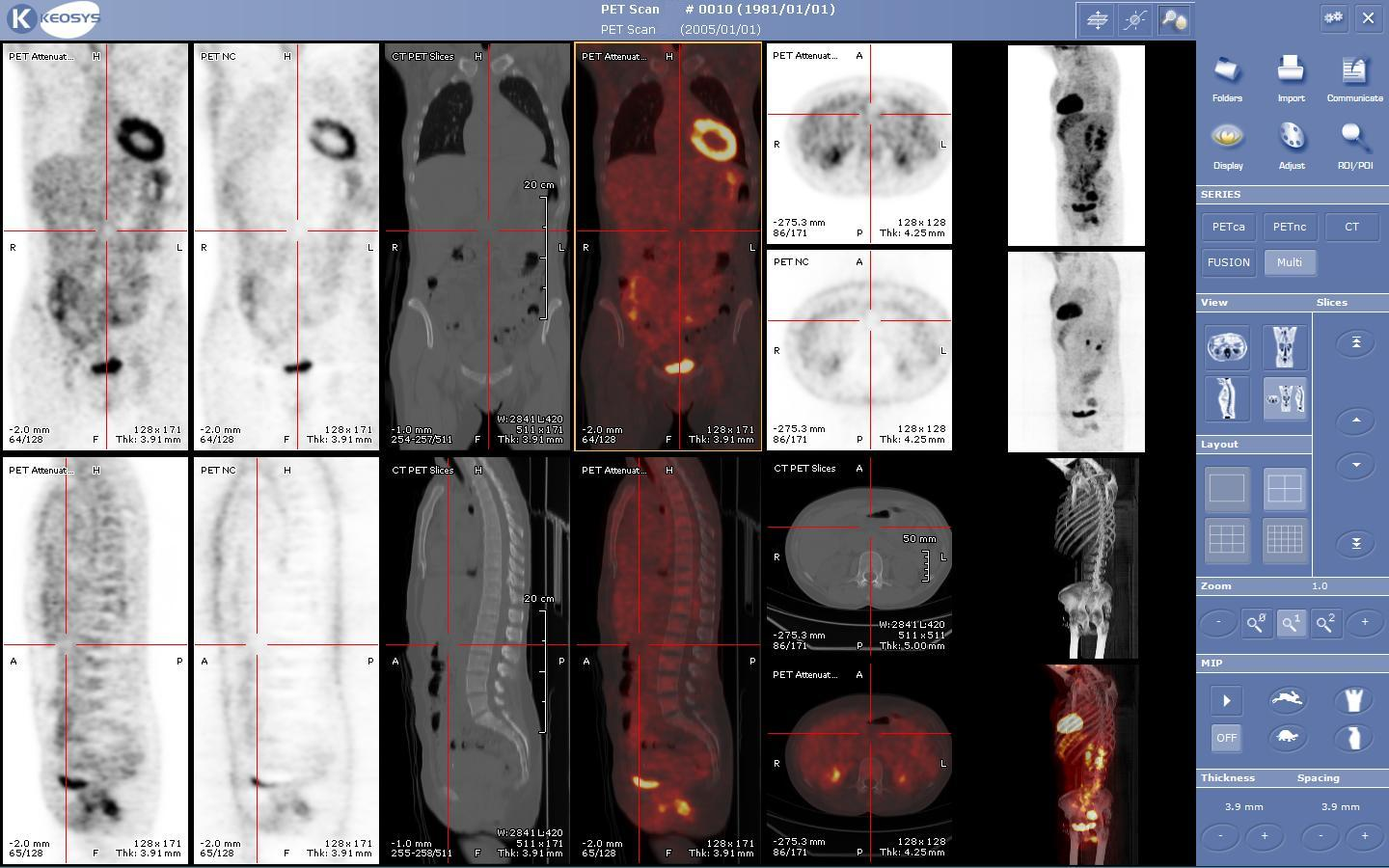
- A complete body PET–CT fusion image
- OPS-301 code: 3-75

Positron emission tomography–computed tomography (better known as PET–CT or PET/CT) is a nuclear medicine technique which combines, in a single gantry, a positron emission tomography (PET) and a computed tomography (CT) scanner, to acquire sequential images from both devices in the same session. The combination of image data are then integrated into a single superposed (co-registered) image that aligns anatomical structures from both imaging modalities into one. Thus, functional imaging obtained by PET, which depicts the spatial distribution of metabolic or biochemical activity in the body can be more precisely aligned or correlated with anatomic imaging obtained by CT scanning. Two- and three-dimensional image reconstruction may be rendered as a function of a common software and control system.

PET–CT has revolutionized medical diagnosis in many fields by integrating the ability to improve quality in locating metabolically active regions to functional projection imaging such as CT. For example, many diagnostic imaging procedures in oncology, surgical planning, radiation therapy and cancer staging have been changing rapidly under the influence of PET–CT availability. Clinical sites that have been gradually substituting conventional PET devices with PET–CT systems have seen enhanced performance from the recently integrated imaging systems. The PET-CT system has the advantage of providing both functions of Positron emission tomography in three dimensions and Computed tomography in two dimensions to create high-quality, full-body diagnostic images. The integration of both modalities provide examinations that produce essential information like tumor localizations, volume size, and quantified metabolic activity levels.

A disadvantage surrounding the use of the PET/PET–CT imaging systems is the difficulty in radiopharmaceuticals production and transportation. Radiopharmaceuticals, also known as radiotracers, have very a short half-life which makes production and transportation bound to extremely short distances from the imaging location. The production requires a very intricate cyclotron as well as a production line for the radiopharmaceuticals and at least one PET–CT radiopharmaceutical is made on site from a generator: Ga-68 from a gallium-68 generator. For example, one of the industry's most commonly used radiotracers fluorodeoxyglucose (^{18}F-FDG) works by tracing glucose metabolic activity within the body and holds a half-life of approximately 120 minutes.

Benefits of PET–CT

- By diagnosing with the help of a PET–CT, the advantages of the two individual methods are combined, and the result considerably exceeds images obtained by the two devices taken separately.
- The method allows identification of all cancerous formations in the body, regardless of their size or degree of development.
- The diagnosis time is short, the doctor can thus save precious time in the fight with the disease
- The substance used, although it is radioactive, presents a very low degree of risk, it is naturally eliminated by the body within a maximum of 24 hours after administration

PET–MRI, like PET–CT, combines modalities to produce co-registered images.

== History ==
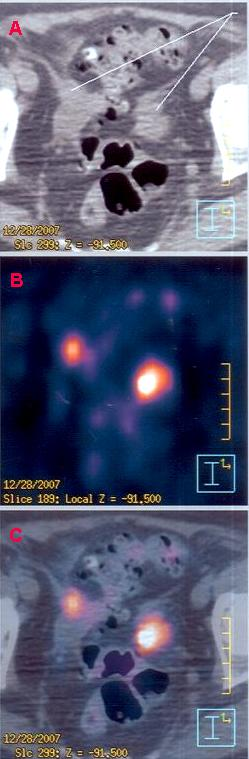
A – CT image; B – PET image; C – Coregistered PET and CT images. The bright red/yellow masses show hypermetabolic areas of the pelvis with metastases of a previous, surgically removed colon carcinoma in a 69-yr-old woman.

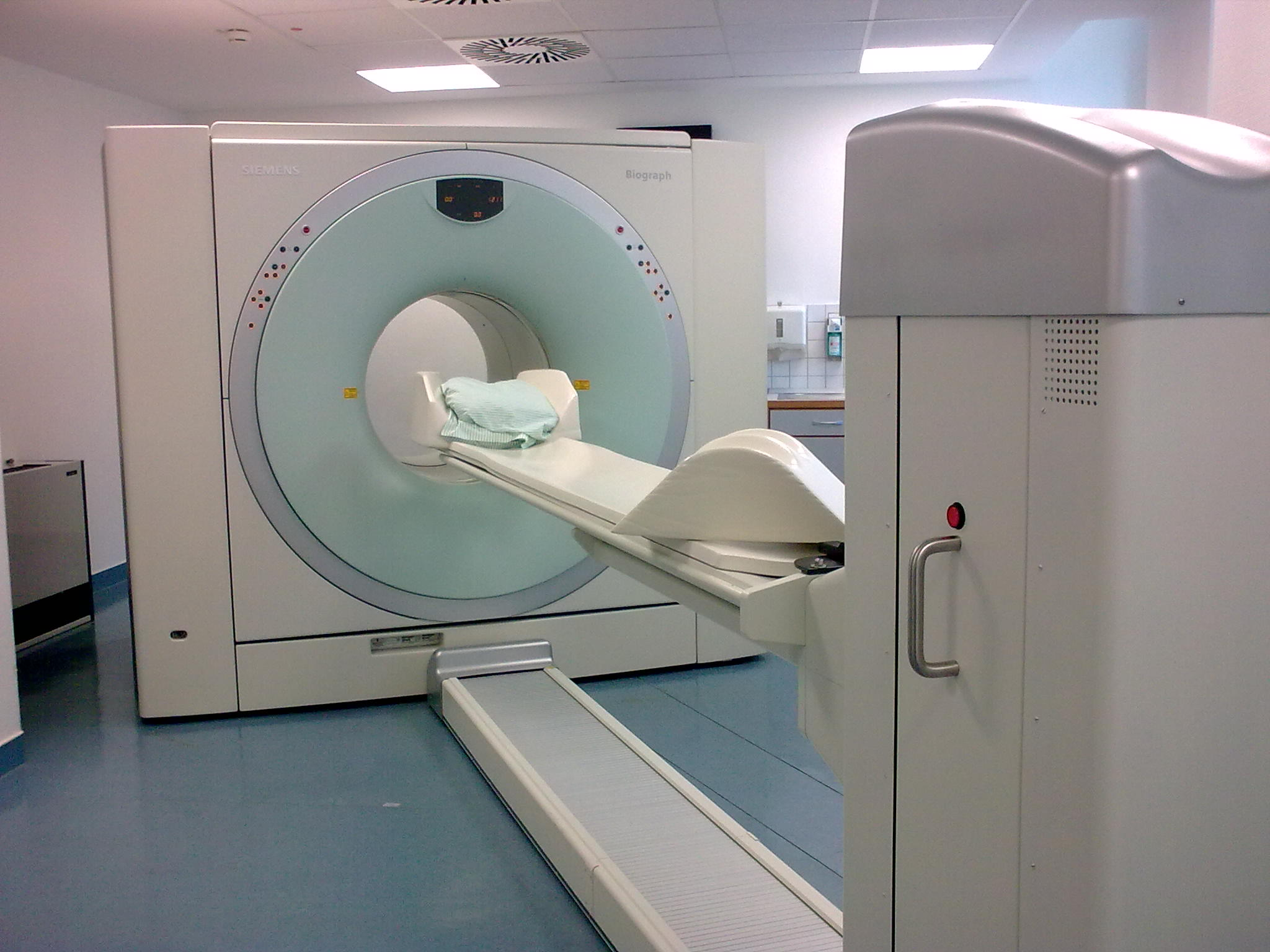
Siemens Biograph PET–CT scanner

The combination of PET and CT scanners was first suggested by R. Raylman in his 1991 Ph.D. thesis. The first PET–CT systems were constructed by David Townsend (at the University of Geneva) and Ronald Nutt (at CPS Innovations in Knoxville, TN) with help from colleagues. The first PET–CT prototype for clinical evaluation was funded by the NCI and installed at the University of Pittsburgh Medical Center in 1998. The first commercial system reached the market by 2001, and by 2004, over 400 systems had been installed worldwide.

In 2015, the European Association of Nuclear Medicine (EANM) published version 2.0 of its procedure guidelines of FDG PET/CT for oncological imaging of adult patients. The updated guidelines emphasized that PET is a quantitative imaging technique and therefore requires common quality control (QC)/ quality assurance (QA) procedure to maintain accuracy and precision of quantitation. They both focused on the importance of adequate repeatability and reproducibility; explaining that both are essential for both clinical management of patients and the use of FDG PET/CT in multicenter trials. The guidelines also noted that combined PET and MRI systems (PET-MRI) had recently come onto the market but were still in development and not yet widely available, and therefore PET/MRI was not addressed in the document.

Over the following decade, hybrid FDG PET imaging became the method of choice for a wide variety of infectious and inflammatory disorders and was adopted into several clinical guidelines. A large amount of evidence-based articles, guidelines, and appropriate use criteria accumulated following the publication of the first version of the EANM infection and inflammation guideline in 2013. This prompted the EANM and the Society of Nuclear Medicine and Molecular Imaging (SNMMI) to jointly publish version 2.0 of the guideline in 2024.

== Procedure for FDG imaging ==
An example of how PET–CT works in the work-up of FDG metabolic mapping follows:

- Before the exam, the patient fasts for at least 4 hours. They should also avoid strenuous exercise for at least 6 hours before (preferably for 24 hours).
- Adequate hydration prior to the examination to ensure a low concentration of FDG in urine is very important. 1 liter of water consumed during the 2 hour period before injection is recommended.
- Blood glucose is measured prior to injection, this is because elevated levels reduce tumor increases of FDG. The scan may need to be rescheduled if glucose levels exceed 11mmol/L (200mg/dL).
- On the day of the exam, the patient rests lying for a minimum of 15 min, in order to quiet down muscular activity, which might be interpreted as abnormal metabolism.
- An intravenous bolus injection of a dose of recently produced 2-FDG or 3-FDG is made, usually by arm vein. Dosage is calculated based on patient weight, the characteristics of the scanner, they will follow the ALARA principle.
- After one or two hours, the patient is placed into the PET–CT device, usually lying in a supine position with the arms resting at the sides, or brought together above the head, depending on the main region of interest (ROI), with the goal of reducing artifacts in the reconstruction.
- An automatic bed moves head first into the gantry, first obtaining a tomogram, also called a scout view or surview, which is a kind of whole body flat sagittal section, obtained with the X-ray tube fixed into the upper position.
- The operator uses the PET–CT computer console to identify the patient and examination, delimit the caudal and rostral limits of the body scan onto the scout view, selects the scanning parameters and starts the image acquisition period, which follows without human intervention. The standard scan range covers from the base of the skull to mid-thigh ("torso imaging").
- The patient is automatically moved head first into the CT gantry, and the x-ray tomogram is acquired.
- Now the patient is automatically moved through the PET gantry, which is mounted in parallel with the CT gantry, and the PET slices are acquired.

A whole body scan, which usually is made from mid-thighs to the top of the head, takes from 5 minutes to 40 minutes depending on the acquisition protocol and technology of the equipment used. FDG imaging protocols acquires slices with a thickness of 2 to 3 mm. Hypermetabolic lesions are shown as false color-coded pixels or voxels onto the gray-value coded CT images. Standardized uptake values are calculated by the software for each hypermetabolic region detected in the image. It provides a quantification of size of the lesion, since functional imaging does not provide a precise anatomical estimate of its extent. The CT can be used for that, when the lesion is also visualized in its images (this is not always the case when hypermetabolic lesions are not accompanied by anatomical changes).

FDG doses in quantities sufficient to carry out four to five examinations are delivered daily, twice or more per day, by the provider to the diagnostic imaging center.

For uses in image-guided radiation therapy of cancer, special fiducial markers are placed in the patient's body before acquiring the PET–CT images. The slices thus acquired may be transferred digitally to a linear accelerator which is used to perform precise bombardment of the target areas using high energy photons (radiosurgery).

== See also ==
- Single-photon emission computed tomography
- Neuroimaging
