= THS =

THS may stand for:

== Education ==
- Student Union at the Royal Institute of Technology, Stockholm (Swedish: Tekniska Högskolans Studentkår)
- Tiyan High School, Guam, United States
- Travis High School, Texas, United States

== Transportation ==
- Toyota Hybrid System, a car technology
- Sukhothai Airport, Thailand, by IATA code
- Tai Hing (South) stop, Hong Kong, by MTR code
- Thurso railway station, Scotland, by GBR code

== Other uses ==
- Theatre Historical Society of America, an American non-profit
- Thyroid-stimulating hormone, a pituitary hormone
- Tottenham Hotspur Stadium, London, England
- Transhuman Space, a 2002 sci-fi roleplaying game

== See also ==
- TH (disambiguation)
- THES (disambiguation)
- Terahertz (disambiguation) (THz)
- Th-stopping, in phonetics
