= Optoacoustic imaging =

Optoacoustic imaging could refer to:

- Photoacoustic imaging
- Multispectral optoacoustic tomography
