= Allan Rosencwaig =

American physicist

Allan Rosencwaig is an American physicist known for pioneering contributions to the fields of photoacoustics, thermal-wave physics, and non-contact optical metrology. He is the founder of Therma-Wave Inc. and is widely recognized for developing instrumentation and theory that transformed semiconductor diagnostics and materials science.

== Education ==
Rosencwaig earned his B.Sc. in Engineering Physics (1963), M.A. in Molecular Physics (1965), and Ph.D. in Solid State Physics (1969), all from the University of Toronto.

== Research career ==
After completing his doctorate, Rosencwaig joined Bell Laboratories in Murray Hill, New Jersey, where he worked on magnetics, x-ray photoelectron spectroscopy, and is best known for developing the field of photoacoustic spectroscopy.

In 1976, Rosencwaig joined the Lawrence Livermore National Laboratory (LLNL) as a group leader in laser fusion. During his tenure, he expanded applications of thermal-wave physics to non-invasive diagnostics of thin films and semiconductor structures. Rosencwaig's work contributed significantly to the fields of microelectronics, surface science, and materials characterization.

== Therma-Wave Inc. ==
In 1982, Rosencwaig founded and was CEO of Therma-Wave Inc. in Fremont, California. The company developed optical and thermal-wave metrology tools used to analyze thin films, dopant distributions, and interface quality during semiconductor manufacturing.

As Chief Executive Officer, Chairman, and Chief Technical Officer, Rosencwaig led development of non-contact systems that became essential for Moore's Law-driven scaling of microelectronics. He remained with the company until his retirement in the early 2000s.

== Publications ==
As of January 2021, Rosencwaig had published over 150 scientific papers, including more than 110 peer-reviewed research and review articles in the fields of photoacoustics, thermal physics, and optical diagnostics. He has an h-index of 41.

Ten of his articles have appeared in Physical Review Letters, and his work has been featured on the covers of Science, Physics Today, and Analytical Chemistry. He is also the author of the monograph Photoacoustics and Photoacoustic Spectroscopy (Wiley-Interscience, 1980).

=== Selected publications ===
- Rosencwaig, A., & Gersho, A. (1976). "Theory of the photoacoustic effect with solids." Journal of Applied Physics, 47(1), 64–69.
- Rosencwaig, A. (1975). "Photoacoustic spectroscopy: New tool for investigation of solids." Analytical Chemistry, 47(6), 592A–604A.
- Rosencwaig, A., & Busse, G. (1980). "High-resolution photoacoustic thermal-wave microscopy." Applied Physics Letters, 36(9), 725.
- Rosencwaig, A., Opsal, J., Smith, W.L., & Willenborg, D.L. (1985). "Detection of thermal waves through optical reflectance." Applied Physics Letters, 46(11), 1013–1015.
- Opsal, J., Rosencwaig, A., & Willenborg, D.L. (1983). "Thermal-wave detection and thin-film thickness measurements with laser beam deflection." Applied Optics, 22(20), 3169–3176.
- Rosencwaig, A., et al. (1987). "Temporal behavior of modulated optical reflectance in silicon." Journal of Applied Physics, 61(1), 240–248.

== Patents ==
Rosencwaig is listed as the inventor or co-inventor on over 71 U.S. and international patents. His inventions span:

- Thermal-wave and photoacoustic metrology systems
- Non-contact optical inspection for semiconductors
- Techniques for dopant profiling and thin-film analysis
- Interface and sub-surface defect detection methods

=== Selected patents ===
- US Patent 4,999,014 – Method and apparatus for measuring thickness of thin films (1991)
- US Patent 5,042,951 – High-resolution ellipsometric apparatus (1991)
- US Patent 4,522,510 – Thin film thickness measurement with thermal waves (1985)
- US Patent 6,429,943 – Critical dimension analysis using simultaneous multiple angles of incidence (2002)
- US Patent 6,278,519 – Apparatus for analyzing multi-layer thin film stacks on semiconductors (2001)
- US Patent 5,596,406 – Multi-wavelength sample characteristic analysis (1997)

== Honors and awards ==
- Victor G. Macres Award (1980) – For pioneering work in photoacoustic spectroscopy
- Fellow of the American Physical Society (1983) – For “pioneering contributions to the development of photoacoustic and thermal-wave physics”
- IPPA Prize (2002) – Awarded by the International Photoacoustic and Photothermal Association for lifetime contributions

== Legacy ==
Rosencwaig is widely regarded for successfully bridging fundamental physics, engineering, and commercial innovation. His research and inventions revolutionized non-invasive material diagnostics and laid the groundwork for tools used in semiconductor fabrication, biomedical imaging, and materials science.

== See also ==
- Photoacoustic spectroscopy
