= Gasera =

Finnish technology company

Gasera Ltd.
- Native name: Gasera Oy
- Company type: Limited company
- Industry: Manufacture of instruments and appliances for measuring, testing and navigation (26510)
- Founded: 12 July 2004; 21 years ago
- Headquarters: Turku, Finland
- Revenue: 2.5 million € (2015)
- Net income: 0.5 million € (2015)
- Number of employees: 31 (2015)
- Website: www.gasera.fi

Gasera Ltd. is a Finnish high-tech company focused on the analysis of gases, liquids and solid materials. The main focus of Gasera is measuring harmful air pollutants in order to protect humans and the environment. Other applications include e.g. greenhouse gas monitoring, automotive and ship emissions monitoring, dissolved gas analysis in transformer oil, CWA and TIC detection, material identification and food production and safety.

== History ==
Gasera was founded in 2004 by Prof. Jyrki Kauppinen and his son Dr. Ismo Kauppinen. The company is a university spin-off of the University of Turku.

== Technology ==
Gasera has developed new technologies to overcome drawbacks in common measurement solutions. Technology solutions are based on cantilever enhanced photoacoustic spectroscopy, Fourier transform infrared principle and widely tunable mid-infrared lasers.

== Products ==
In 2016 Gasera launched GASERA ONE, portable photoacoustic multi-gas analyzer for protecting life, health and security. GASERA ONE utilises several different infrared light source technologies, such as widely tunable quantum cascade lasers (QCLs), enables countless application areas for reliable ppb-level trace gas monitoring, such as VOCs, inorganics, hydrocarbons, fluorocarbons, anesthetics, and corrosives at very low concentrations. Gasera also offers photoacoustic accessories for laboratory FTIR instruments and research photoacoustic detectors.

== Projects ==
=== IRON - Horizon 2020 ===
In 2015 Gasera received funding of 2.3 million euros from the EU program Horizon 2020. With the funding Gasera will develop and commercialize high performance hand-held IRON device for gas measurement to enable on-site detection of hazardous chemicals in cargo containers.

=== DOGGIES ===
In 2016 Gasera completed a three-year collaboration with the European Union in the DOGGIES (Detection of Olfactory traces by orthoGonal Gas identification technologIES) project, developing technology that imitates sniffer dogs for border patrol and the police. The technology can be used for detecting different drugs, such as amphetamine, cocaine, heroin and cannabis. DOGGIES was funded by the European Commission under the 7th Framework Programme for Research and Technological Development.

=== Other EU Projects ===
Other EU projects funded by the European Commission under the 7th Framework Programmes for Research and Technological Development Gasera has participated are CUSTOM, GasPro-Bio-Waste, MINIGAS, MUSE-Tech, OPTIMALT, Pro-Bio HySens, VItiSpec and Zero-VOC.

=== SOCKS ===
SOCKS is a project inside the HyperGlobal consortium funded by Tekes’ Arktiset Meret program. The aim of the consortium is to develop and commercialise high performance gas sensing solutions for ship emissions monitoring. As an outcome of the SOCKS project, Gasera will develop an analyzer capable of simultaneously sensing the sulphur dioxide (SO_{2}) and carbon dioxide (CO_{2}) concentrations in air nearby seaways, from which the sulphur content of the fuel used by the ship can be calculated.
