= Golay cell =

Schematic of a Golay cell

The Golay cell is a type of opto-acoustic detector mainly used for infrared spectroscopy. It consists of a gas-filled enclosure with an infrared absorbing material and a flexible diaphragm or membrane. When infrared radiation is absorbed, it heats the gas, causing it to expand. The resulting increase in pressure deforms the membrane. Light reflected off the membrane is detected by a photodiode, and motion of the membrane produces a change in the signal on the photodiode. The concept was originally described in 1947 by Marcel J. E. Golay, after whom it came to be named.

The Golay cell has high sensitivity and a flat response over a very broad range of frequencies. The response time is modest, of order 10 ms. The detector performance is degraded in the presence of mechanical vibrations.

== See also ==
- Photoacoustic effect
- Microwave auditory effect
- Photoacoustic spectroscopy
- Photoacoustic flow cytometry
- Photoacoustic Doppler effect
