= Cantilever enhanced photoacoustic spectroscopy =

Cantilever enhanced photoacoustic spectroscopy enables the detection of small amount of trace gases which is vital in many applications. Photoacoustic spectroscopy is one of the most sensitive optical detection schemes. It is based on detecting a gas specific acoustic wave generated that originates from the absorption of light in the medium. The sensitivity of the traditional membrane microphones is limited by electrical noise and the nonlinearity of the displacement of the mechanical sensor at high optical power levels. Conventional membrane microphones can be replaced with optically measured micromechanical cantilevers to enhance sensitivity.

== Characteristics ==
The novel MEMS cantilever approach detects pressure changes in a photoacoustic cell. High sensitivity is achieved by using a cantilever pressure sensor that is over hundred times more sensitive compared to a membrane, which is conventionally used in photoacoustic spectroscopy. A laser-based readout interferometer is able to accurately measure displacement from well under a picometer up to millimeters.

== Technology ==
An extremely thin cantilever portion moves like a flexible door due to the pressure variations in the surrounding gas. The displacement of the cantilever is measured with an accurate interferometric readout system. This way the "breathing effect" can be avoided. The so-called breathing effect occurs in capacitive measurement principle where the other electrode damps the movement of the sensor and restricts the dynamic range.

=== Cantilever sensor ===
The cantilever sensor is made out of single crystal SOI-silicon with a specially developed dry-etching process that leads to a highly stable and robust component; this is why the sensor is practically totally immune to temperature and humidity variations. In addition, the sensor does not suffer from wearing. The sensor and readout can be isolated in terms of temperature allowing heated gas cell which enables applications that require gas analysis at elevated temperatures such as chemical emissions monitoring and process control.

== Applications ==
Cantilever enhanced photoacoustics measuring technology can be used e.g. in detection and analysis of gases, liquids, and solid materials in applications of research, industry, environmental, safety, and security.

== See also ==
- Golay cell
- Quartz-Enhanced Photoacoustic Spectroscopy
