= Intensity modulation =

In optical communications, intensity modulation (IM) is a form of modulation in which the optical power output of a source is varied in accordance with some characteristic of the modulating signal. The envelope of the modulated optical signal is an analog of the modulating signal in the sense that the instantaneous power of the envelope is an analog of the characteristic of interest in the modulating signal.

The recovery of the modulating signal is typically achieved by direct detection, not heterodyning. However, optical heterodyne detection is possible and has been actively studied since 1979. Bell Laboratories had a working, but impractical, system in 1969. Heterodyne and homodyne systems are of interest because they are expected to produce an increase in sensitivity of up to 20 dB allowing longer hops between islands for instance. Such systems also have the important advantage of very narrow channel spacing in optical frequency-division multiplexing (OFDM) systems. OFDM is a step beyond wavelength-division multiplexing (WDM). Normal WDM using direct detection does not achieve anything like the close channel spacing of radio frequency FDM.

== Intensity modulation with direct detection ==
Intensity Modulation / Direct Detection (IM/DD) is a scheme is simple and cost-effective in fiber optic communication, making it a suitable for various optical communication applications. It involves modulating the optical power of the carrier signal to represent the transmitted data. This modulation can be achieved using techniques, such as on-off keying (OOK). The intensity-modulated optical signal is generated by modulating the amplitude or the current of the light source, typically a laser diode with one or two cavity designs such as Fabry-Perot or distributed feedback (DFB).

At the receiver end, direct detection (DD) is used to recover the modulated signal. The modulated optical signal is detected by a photodetector (most commonly PIN or APD photodiode), which converts the optical power variations into corresponding electrical current or voltage variations. The output of the photodetector is then processed and decoded to retrieve the original information.

== See also ==
- Photoacoustic Doppler effect
