= Photoacoustic microscopy =

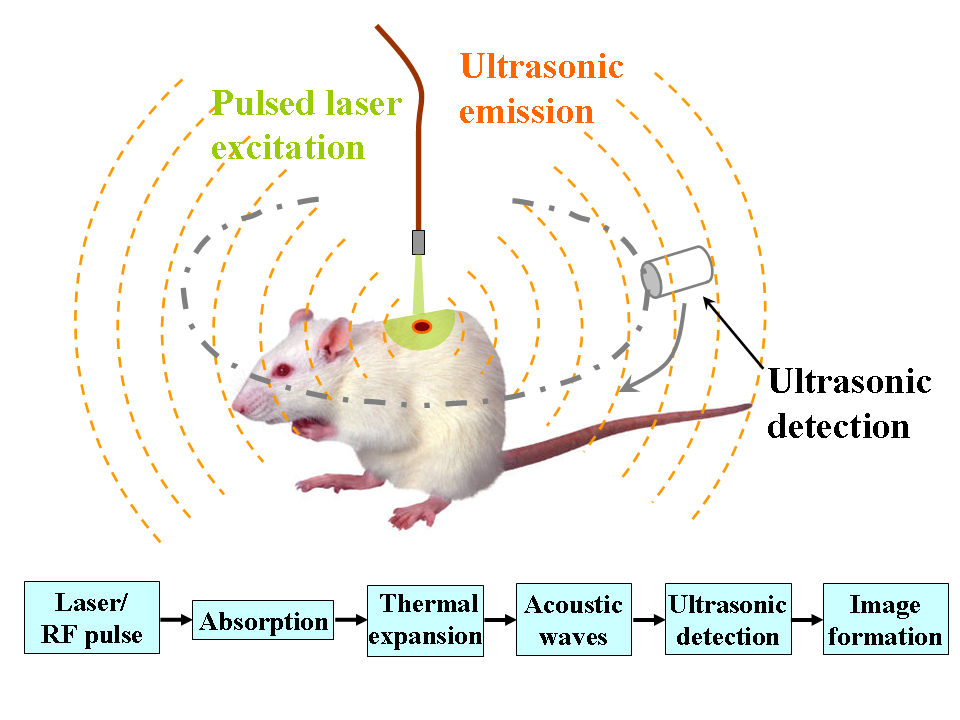
Photoacoustic imaging schematic

Photoacoustic microscopy is an imaging method based on the photoacoustic effect and is a subset of photoacoustic tomography. Photoacoustic microscopy takes advantage of the local temperature rise that occurs as a result of light absorption in tissue. Using a nanosecond pulsed laser beam, tissues undergo thermoelastic expansion, resulting in the release of a wide-band acoustic wave that can be detected using a high-frequency ultrasound transducer. Since ultrasonic scattering in tissue is weaker than optical scattering, photoacoustic microscopy is capable of achieving high-resolution images at greater depths than conventional microscopy methods. Furthermore, photoacoustic microscopy is especially useful in the field of biomedical imaging due to its scalability. By adjusting the optical and acoustic foci, lateral resolution may be optimized for the desired imaging depth.

== Photoacoustic signal ==
The goal of photoacoustic microscopy is to find the local pressure rise $p_0$, which can be used to calculate the absorption coefficient $\mu_a$ according to the formula:

$p_0 = \Gamma\eta_{th}\mu_aF,$

where $\eta_{th}$ is the percentage of light converted to heat, $F$ is the local optical fluence (J/cm^{2}), and the dimensionless Gruneisen parameter $\Gamma$ is defined as:

$\Gamma = \frac{\beta}{\kappa\rho C_V},$

where $\beta$ is the thermal coefficient of volume expansion (K^{−1}), $\kappa$ is the isothermal compressibility (Pa^{−1}), and $\rho$ is the density (kg/m^{3}).

Following the initial pressure rise, a photoacoustic wave propagates at the speed of sound within the medium and can be detected with an ultrasound transducer.

== Image reconstruction ==
One of the major benefits of photoacoustic microscopy is the simplicity of image reconstruction. A laser pulse excites tissue in the axial direction and the resulting photoacoustic waves are detected by an ultrasound transducer. The transducer then converts the mechanical energy into a voltage signal that can be read by an analog-to-digital converter for post-processing. A one-dimensional image, known as an A-line, is formed as a result of each laser pulse. Hilbert transform of an A-line reveals depth-encoded information. A 3D photoacoustic image can then be formed by combining multiple A-lines produced by 2D raster scanning.

=== Synthetic Aperture Image Reconstruction ===
Altering delays of the elements on an ultrasound transducer allows one to focus ultrasound waves similar to passing through an acoustic lens. This delay-and-sum method enables one to find the signal at each focal point. However, the lateral resolution is limited by the presence of side lobes, which appear at polar angles and are dependent on the width of each element.

== Contrast ==
In photoacoustic imaging modalities, including photoacoustic microscopy, contrast is based on photon excitation and is thus determined by the optical properties of the tissue. When an electron absorbs a photon, it moves to a higher energy state. Upon returning to a lower energy level, the electron undergoes either radiative or nonradiative relaxation. During radiative relaxation, the electron releases energy in the form of a photon. On the other hand, an electron undergoing nonradiative relaxation releases energy as heat. The heat then induces a pressure rise that propagates as a photoacoustic wave. Due to the fact that almost all molecules are capable of nonradiative relaxation, photoacoustic microscopy has the potential to image a wide range of endogenous and exogenous agents. By contrast, fewer molecules are capable of radiative relaxation, thus limiting fluorescence microscopy techniques such as one-photon and two-photon microscopy. Current research in photoacoustic microscopy takes advantage of both endogenous and exogenous contrast agents to gain functional information about the body, from blood saturation levels to cancer proliferation rate.

=== Endogenous Contrast Agents ===
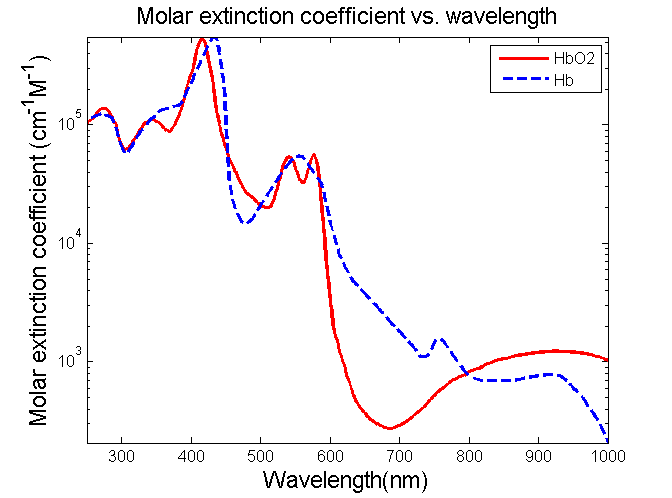
Absorption profile of oxy- and deoxyhemoglobin

Endogenous contrast agents, molecules naturally occurring within the body, are useful in photoacoustic microscopy due to the fact that they may be imaged non-invasively. Endogenous agents are also non-toxic and do not affect the properties of the tissue being studied. In particular, endogenous absorbers can be classified based on their absorbing wavelengths.

==== Ultraviolet Absorbers ====
Within the ultraviolet light range (λ = 180 to 400 nm), the primary absorber in the body is DNA and RNA. By using ultraviolet photoacoustic microscopy, DNA and RNA can be imaged in the cell nuclei without the use of fluorescence labeling. Since cancer is associated with DNA replication failure, UV photoacoustic microscopy has the potential to be used for early cancer detection.

==== Visible Light Absorbers ====
Visible light absorbers (λ = 400 to 700 nm) include oxyhemoglobin, deoxyhemoglobin, melanin, and cytochrome c. Visible light photoacoustic microscopy is particularly useful in determining hemoglobin concentration and oxygen saturation due to the difference in absorption profiles of oxyhemoglobin and deoxyhemoglobin. Real-time analysis can then be used to determine blood flow speed and oxygen metabolism rate. In addition, photoacoustic microscopy is capable of early melanoma detection due to the high concentration of melanin found in skin cancer cells.

==== Near-Infrared Absorbers ====
Near-Infrared absorbers (λ = 700 to 1400 nm) include water, lipids, and glucose. Photoacoustic determination of blood glucose levels can be used for treating diabetes, while studying lipid concentrations within blood vessels is important for monitoring the progression of atherosclerosis. It is still feasible to quantify and compare deoxyhemoglobin and hemoglobin concentrations at this wavelength, trading deeper tissue penetration for lower absorption.

=== Exogenous Contrast Agents ===
Although endogenous contrasts agents are noninvasive and simpler to use, they are limited by their inherent behavior and concentration, making it difficult to monitor certain processes if optical absorption is weak. On the other hand, exogenous agents can be engineered to specifically bind to certain molecules of interest. In addition, the concentration of exogenous agents can be optimized to produce a greater signal and provide more contrast. Through selective binding, exogenous contrast agents are capable of targeting specific molecules of interest while also enhancing resulting images.

==== Organic Dyes ====
Organic dyes, such as ICG-PEG and Evans blue, are used to enhance vasculature as well as to improve tumor imaging. In addition, dyes are easily filtered out of the body due to their small size (≤ 3 nm).

==== Nanoparticles ====
Nanoparticles are currently being researched due to their chemical inactivity and ability to target tumor cells. These properties allow for cancer propagation to be monitored and potentially enables intraoperative cancer removal. However, more studies on short-term toxicity effects are necessary to determine if nanoparticles are suitable for clinical research. Gold nanoparticles have shown promise as a contrast agent for image-guided medicine. AuNPs have been widely used as contrast agents due to their strong and tunable optical absorption.

==== Fluorescent Proteins ====
Fluorescent proteins have been developed for fluorescence microscopy imaging and are unique in that they can be genetically encoded and therefore do not need to be delivered into the body. Using photoacoustic microscopy, fluorescent proteins can be visualized at depths beyond the limit of typical microscopy methods. Frequency-dependent acoustic attenuation in tissue and dampening of higher frequencies limits the bandwidth of light propagation through deeper regions in tissue. Fluorescent proteins act as light source at the target region, bypassing the limitation of optical attenuation. However, the effectiveness of fluorescent proteins is limited by low fluence changes, as the light diffusion equation predicts lower than 5% increase.

== Resolution ==
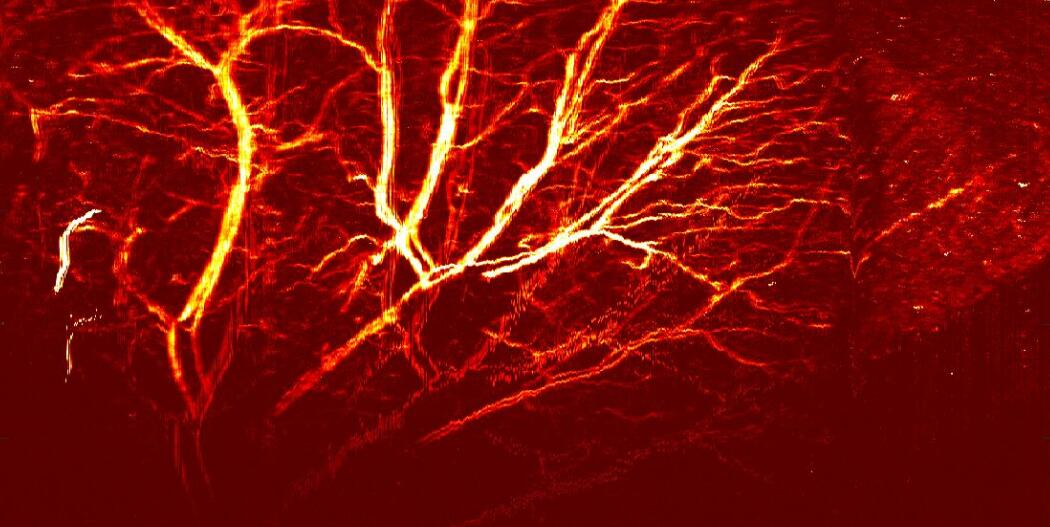
Mouse ear vasculature imaged using OR-PAM at 532 nm

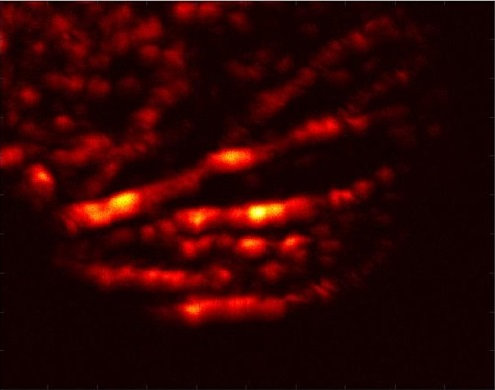
Mouse ear vasculature imaged using AR-PAM at 532 nm

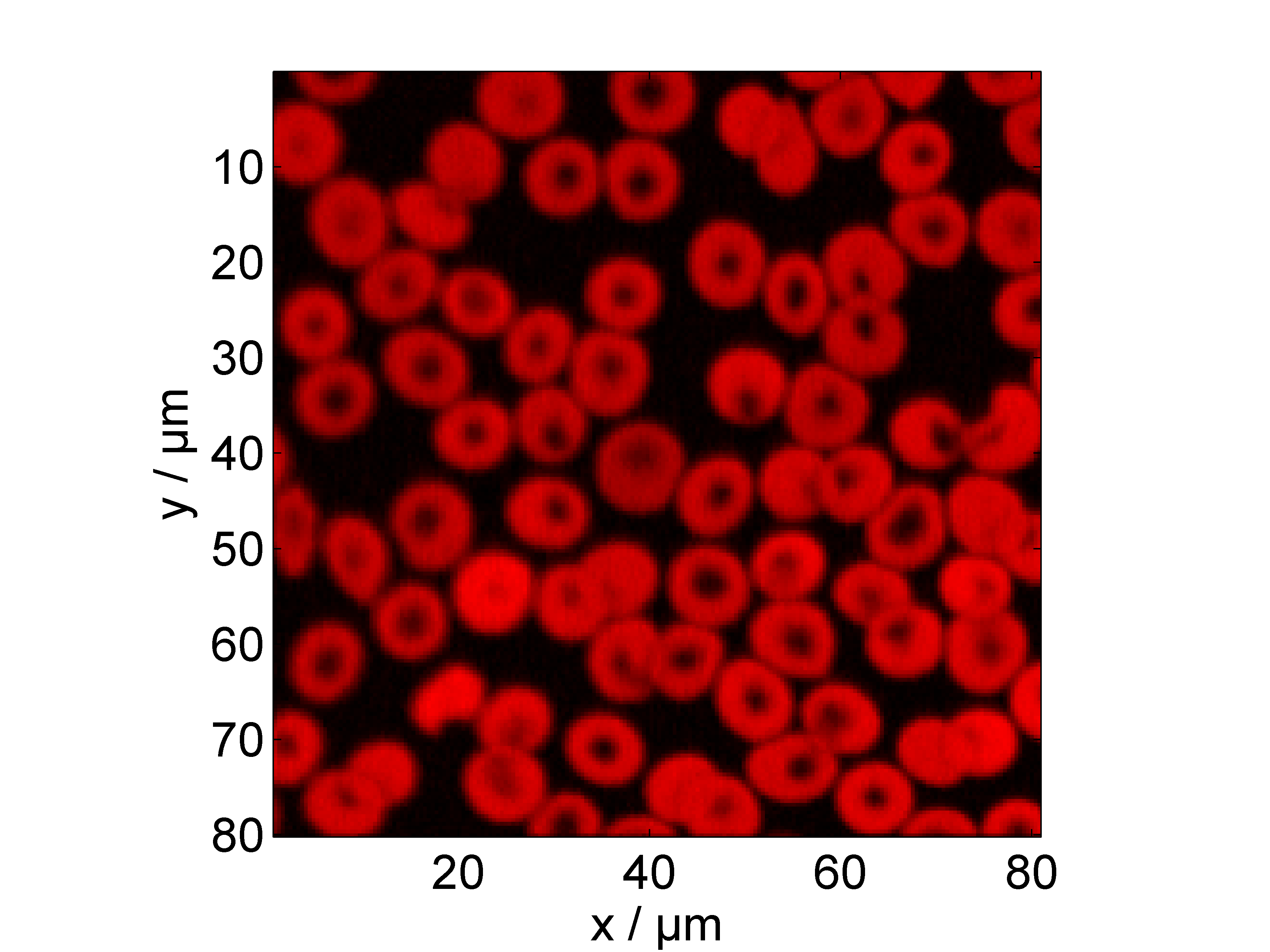
Photoacoustic micrograph of methanol-fixed human red blood cells using 405 nm

Photoacoustic microscopy achieves greater penetration than conventional microscopy due to ultrasonic detection. As a result, axial resolution is defined acoustically and is determined by the formula:

$R_{axial} = 0.88\frac{\nu_A}{\Delta f_A},$

where $\nu_A$ is the speed of sound in the medium and $\Delta f_A$ is the photoacoustic signal bandwidth. The axial resolution of the system can be improved by using a wider bandwidth ultrasound transducer as long as the bandwidth matches that of the photoacoustic signal. The lateral resolution of photoacoustic microscopy depends on the optical and acoustic foci of the system. Optical-resolution photoacoustic microscopy (OR-PAM) uses a tighter optical focus than acoustic focus, while acoustic-resolution photoacoustic microscopy (AR-PAM) uses a tighter acoustic focus than optical focus.

=== Optical-Resolution Photoacoustic microscopy ===
Due to a tighter optical focus, OR-PAM is more useful for imaging in the quasi-ballistic range of depths up to 1 mm. The lateral resolution of OR-PAM is determined by the formula:

$R_{lateral, O} = 0.51\frac{\lambda_O}{NA_O},$

where $\lambda_O$ is the optical wavelength and $NA_O$ is the numerical aperture of the optical objective lens. The lateral resolution of OR-PAM can be improved by using a shorter laser pulse and tighter focusing of the laser spot. OR-PAM systems can typically achieve a lateral resolution of 0.2 to 10 μm, allowing OR-PAM to be classified as a super-resolution imaging method.

=== Acoustic-Resolution Photoacoustic microscopy ===
At depths greater than 1 mm and up to 3 mm, acoustic-resolution photoacoustic microscopy (AR-PAM) is more useful due to greater optical scattering. Acoustic scattering is much weaker beyond the optical diffusion limit, making AR-PAM more practical as it provides higher lateral resolution at these depths. The lateral resolution of AR-PAM is determined by the formula:

$R_{lateral, A} = 0.71\frac{\lambda_A}{NA_A},$

where $\lambda_A$ is the central wavelength of the photoacoustic wave and $NA_A$ is the numerical aperture of the ultrasound transducer. Higher lateral resolution can therefore be achieved by increasing the center frequency of the ultrasound transducer and tighter acoustic focusing. AR-PAM systems can typically achieve a lateral resolution of 15 to 50 μm.

== Dark-field Confocal Photoacoustic microscopy ==
Depiction of PAM raster scanning path

By ignoring ballistic light, dark-field confocal photoacoustic microscopy reduces surface signal. This method uses a dark-field pulsed laser and high-NA ultrasonic detection, with the fiber output end coaxially aligned with the focused ultrasound transducer. Filtration of ballistic light relies on the altered shape of the excitation laser beam instead of an opaque disk, as used in conventional dark-field microscopy. The general reconstruction technique is used to convert the photoacoustic signal into one A-line, and B-line images are produced by raster scanning.

== Biomedical applications ==
Photoacoustic microscopy has a wide range of applications in the biomedical field. Due to its ability to image a variety of molecules based on optical wavelength, photoacoustic microscopy can be used to gain functional information about the body noninvasively. Blood flow dynamics and oxygen metabolic rates can be measured and correlated to studies of atherosclerosis or tumor proliferation. Exogenous agents can be used to bind to cancerous tissue, enhancing image contrast and aiding in surgical removal. On the same note, photoacoustic microscopy is useful in early cancer diagnosis due to the difference in optical absorption properties compared to healthy tissue.

== See also ==
- Photoacoustic imaging
- Deep learning in photoacoustic imaging
