= Photoacoustic spectroscopy =

Measurement of absorbed electromagnetic energy

Photoacoustic spectroscopy is the measurement of the effect of absorbed electromagnetic energy (particularly of light) on matter by means of acoustic detection. The discovery of the photoacoustic effect dates to 1880 when Alexander Graham Bell showed that thin discs emitted sound when exposed to a beam of sunlight that was rapidly interrupted with a rotating slotted disk. The absorbed energy from the light causes local heating, generating a thermal expansion which creates a pressure wave or sound. Later Bell showed that materials exposed to the non-visible portions of the solar spectrum (i.e., the infrared and the ultraviolet) can also produce sounds.

Although Bell discovered the underlying effect, the ability to extract meaningful material information through photoacoustic signals—forming the basis of photoacoustic spectroscopy—was not achieved until nearly a century later. In the 1970s, physicist Allan Rosencwaig developed the theoretical foundations and experimental techniques that established photoacoustic spectroscopy as a powerful analytical tool. His work, including the development of the Rosencwaig–Gersho model, enabled quantitative interpretation of photoacoustic signals in solids and laid the groundwork for practical applications in condensed matter physics, semiconductor diagnostics, and biomedical imaging. These developments are discussed extensively in Rosencwaig’s monograph, Photoacoustics and Photoacoustic Spectroscopy, Wiley, 1980.

A photoacoustic spectrum of a sample can be recorded by measuring the sound at different wavelengths of the light. This spectrum can be used to identify the absorbing components of the sample. The photoacoustic effect can be used to study solids, liquids and gases.

== laser-induced photoacoustic spectroscopy ==
laser-induced photoacoustic spectroscopy (LIPAS)—also known as Laser Photoacoustic Spectroscopy (LPAS)—is a highly sensitive analytical and non-destructive testing technique. It converts absorbed laser light into sound waves (acoustic pressure waves) to measure the optical and thermal properties of gases, liquids, solids, or biological tissues.

== Cantilever enhanced photoacoustic spectroscopy ==
Cantilever-enhanced photoacoustic spectroscopy (CEPAS) is a highly sensitive trace gas and material detection technique that replaces traditional membrane microphones with a micromechanical silicon cantilever beam.

== Quartz-Enhanced Photoacoustic Spectroscopy ==
Quartz-Enhanced Photoacoustic Spectroscopy (QEPAS) is a high-sensitivity and selective optical sensing technique used for trace gas quantification and environmental monitoring.

- Photoacoustic Effect: A laser beam tuned to a specific absorption line of a target gas passes through a gas sample. When the laser intensity is modulated, the gas molecules absorb the light and release thermal energy via non-radiative relaxation, creating periodic acoustic pressure waves.
- Acoustic Transduction: Instead of a traditional microphone, QEPAS uses a quartz tuning fork (QTF)—similar to the ones found in electronic watches—as a high-Q acoustic transducer.
- Piezoelectric Conversion: The acoustic pressure waves force the prongs of the QTF to vibrate. Because quartz is piezoelectric, this mechanical deflection converts directly into an electrical voltage or current signal.
- Resonant Amplification: A pair of small acoustic resonator tubes (acting like tiny organ pipes) is often placed on either side of the QTF prongs to amplify the sound wave intensity before it hits the fork.

Key Advantages

- High Noise Immunity: A quartz tuning fork with a high Q-factor functions as a narrow-band filter, making it possible to eliminate noise. The QTF's symmetric quadrupole mode responds almost exclusively to sound generated directly between its prongs, filtering out background and ambient room noise.
- Compact Footprint: Because the acoustic detection relies on the tiny QTF rather than a large gas cell, the total sampling volume can be less than 1.3 mm³.
- Ultra-Low Detection Limits: Systems can reliably detect trace gases down to parts-per-billion (ppb) or parts-per-trillion (ppt) levels.
- Wavelength Independence: The technique works across a wide spectral range, utilizing near-infrared diode lasers, mid-infrared quantum cascade lasers (QCLs), and terahertz sources

== Uses and techniques ==
Exemplary assembly of a photoacoustic spectroscope for gas analysis

Photoacoustic spectroscopy has become a powerful technique to study concentrations of gases at the part per billion or even part per trillion levels. Modern photoacoustic detectors still rely on the same principles as Bell's apparatus; however, to increase the sensitivity, several modifications have been made.

Instead of sunlight, intense lasers are used to illuminate the sample since the intensity of the generated sound is proportional to the light intensity; this technique is referred to as laser photoacoustic spectroscopy (LPAS). The ear has been replaced by sensitive microphones, silicon cantilever or quartz tuning fork (QTF). The microphone signals are further amplified and detected using lock-in amplifiers. By enclosing the gaseous sample in a cylindrical chamber, the sound signal is amplified by tuning the modulation frequency to an acoustic resonance of the sample cell.

By using cantilever enhanced photoacoustic spectroscopy sensitivity can still be further improved enabling reliable monitoring of gases on ppb-level.

== Example ==
The following example illustrates the potential of the photoacoustic technique: In the early 1970s, Patel and co-workers measured the temporal variation of the concentration of nitric oxide in the stratosphere at an altitude of 28 km with a balloon-borne photoacoustic detector. These measurements provided crucial data bearing on the problem of ozone depletion by man-made nitric oxide emission. Some of the early work relied on development of the RG theory by Rosencwaig and Gersho.

== Applications ==
One of the important capabilities of using FTIR photoacoustic spectroscopy has been the ability to evaluate samples in their in situ state by infrared spectroscopy, which can be used to detect and quantify chemical functional groups and thus chemical substances. This is particularly useful for biological samples that can be evaluated without crushing to powder or subjecting to chemical treatments. Seashells, bone and such samples have been investigated. Using photoacoustic spectroscopy has helped evaluate molecular interactions in bone with osteogenesis imperfecta.

While most academic research has concentrated on high resolution instruments, some work has gone in the opposite direction. In the last twenty years, very low cost instruments for applications such as leakage detection and for the control of carbon dioxide concentration have been developed and commercialized. Typically, low cost thermal sources are used which are modulated electronically. Diffusion through semi-permeable disks instead of valves for gas exchange, low-cost microphones, and proprietary signal processing with digital signal processors have brought down the costs of these systems. The future of low-cost applications of photoacoustic spectroscopy may be the realization of fully integrated micromachined photoacoustic instruments.

The photoacoustic approach has been utilized to quantitatively measure macromolecules, such as proteins. The photoacoustic immunoassay labels and detects target proteins using nanoparticles that can generate strong acoustic signals. The photoacoustics-based protein analysis has also been applied for point-of-care testings.

Photoacoustic spectroscopy also has many military applications. One such application is the detection toxic chemical agents. The sensitivity of photoacoustic spectroscopy makes it an ideal analysis technique for detecting trace chemicals associated with chemical attacks.

LPAS sensors may be applied in industry, security (nerve agent and explosives detection), and medicine (breath analysis).

The Photoacoustic Sensing of Explosives (PHASE) system applies principles from atmospheric LIDAR: the high peak power of a modulated UV laser causes explosives to dissociate and vaporize into the surrounding atmosphere, generating intense, localized pressure fluctuations. These fluctuations create ultrasonic waves that cause atmospheric disturbances, which are then detected remotely using a laser Doppler vibrometer, processed via optical heterodyne detection, and analyzed using specialized algorithms. By employing a UV laser, the PHASE system can excite explosive materials located up to 100 meters away.

== See also ==
- Golay cell
