= Photoacoustic flow cytometry =

Photoacoustic Flow Cytometery

Photoacoustic flow cytometry or PAFC is a biomedical imaging modality that utilizes photoacoustic imaging to perform flow cytometry. A flow of cells passes a photoacoustic system producing individual signal response. Each signal is counted to produce a quantitative evaluation of the input sample.

== Description ==
Traditional flow cytometry uses cells in a laminar single file stream which then passes through a light source. Using various quantification of light scattering from the cells enables the system to quantify cellular size and complexity which can ultimately be returned in a quantification of cell composition within a sample. Photoacoustic flow cytometry operates on similar principles, but utilizes a photoacoustic signal to differentiate cellular patterns. Furthermore, flow cytometry provides great ex-vivo analysis, but due to its pure optical source its penetration depth is limited making in-vivo analysis limited. Alternatively, photoacoustics may provide an advantage over flow cytometry as it receives an acoustic signal rather than an optical one and can penetrate to greater depths as discussed further in operating principles and mathematics.

The photoacoustic (PA) affect was discovered by Alexander Bell in 1880, occurs when a photon source is absorbed by an optically receptive substance producing an ultrasonic wave. The strength of the ultrasonic wave produced is a function of intensity of photon absorbed, and the innate properties of the substance illuminated. Each substance of interest absorbs photons at a specific wavelength, as a result only certain substances will innately produce a PA signal at a given wavelength. For example, hemoglobin and melanin are two common biological substances that produce strong PA signals in response to laser pulses around the 680 nm wavelength range. The absorption spectrum for the PA lies within the visible electromagnetic spectrum, making PA imaging non-radiative in nature. The specific absorption spectrum can both be a limitation and an exploitation of PA imaging (see more in applications).

Systems commonly use an Nd:YAG (neodymium-doped yttrium aluminum garnet) or LED laser system that is pulsed to penetrate the biological tissue of interest. With each pulse that comes in contact with tissue, a PA signal in the form of an ultrasound wave is produced. This ultrasound wave propagates through the tissue until it reaches an ultrasound transducer to produce an a-line. The maximum amplitude of each a-line is extracted and its value is plotted on a time vs amplitude graph producing a cytometry graphic .

== Operating principles and mathematics ==
=== Heat production ===
Photoacoustic flow cytometry operates on the principle of the photoacoustic effect, whereby a laser in the visible spectrum produces a temperature rise and thus a thermal expansion. The thermal expansion equation with relation to laser intensity for a pulsating laser is described below.

$H(z,t)=\mu_a I_0 e^{-\omega t}$

Where $\mu_a$ is the absorption coefficient of the focused equation, $I_0$ is the intensity of the laser, ⍵ is the frequency of the laser pulse, t is time. $e^{-i \omega t}$ is described as the exponential expression of a sinusoidal function determined by Euler's formula. The penetration depth of the laser is limited by the diffusive regime, which is dependent on the attenuation through the tissue prior to biological target to be irradiated.

=== Photoacoustic wave relationship ===
Below then establishes the heat-pressure relationship for a photoacoustic signal.

$[\nabla^2-{1 \over \nu_s}{\partial \over \partial t^2}]p(z,t)=-{\beta \over C_p}{\partial H \over \partial t}$

Where ∇ is the partial differential equation set with spatial relationship, $\nu_s$ is the speed of sound in the substance of interest, t is time, $p(z,t)$ is pressure as a function of both time and space, β is the thermal expansion coefficient, $C_p$ is the specific heat capacity, and ${\partial H \over \partial t}$ is the partial differential of the heat equation described above.

The left side of the equation describes the pressure wave equation which is derived for modeling of an ultrasonic pressure wave equation. The right side of the equation determines the relationship of heat production to thermal expansion resulting in a pressure wave.

=== Pressure wave solution ===
While reality produces a three dimensional wave that propagates through the tissue, for the purposes of PAFC, the information needed only pertains to a one dimensional analysis. Below demonstrates the one dimensional solution due to a pulsed laser.

$p(z,t)= {\mu_a \beta F \nu_s^2 \over 2C_p}\hat{h}(z,t)$

Where $\mu_a$ is the absorption coefficient, is the thermal expansion coefficient, $C_p$ is the specific heat, F is the fluence of the laser, $\nu_s$ is the speed of sound in a given material and $\hat{h}(z,t)$ is the total energy derived from the laser pulse.

For long duration laser exposure, the wave equation becomes largely a function of laser intensity. For the purposes of analyzing PA signal, the laser pulse must be short in time to produce a signal that its value varies on the properties of the irradiated substance to differentiate the targets of interest. The differences in the pressure wave produced is the basis for signal separation in PAFC.

=== Signal detection ===
Example PAFC where red cells produce a red signal of smaller amplitude. Counting the blue amplitudes shows one blue cell within the sample

The pressure wave created is in the form of an ultrasound wave. The wave propagates through the material and is detected by an ultrasound transducer. The pressure is sensed via piezoelectric crystals which converts the pressure into a voltage change, i.e., the amplitude of the signal is proportional to the value of the pressure at any given time. This voltage is plotted as a function of time and results in the formation of an a-line previously described.

The temporal data is important for other types of photoacoustic imaging, but for the purposes of PAFC, the maximum amplitude within an a-line is extracted as the data point. For each laser pulse this maximum amplitude value is plotted vs time producing a flow cytometry signal tracing. Each line represents a laser pulse and its amplitude reflects the target irradiated. By selecting an amplitude range that is representative of a particular cell type, the signals can be counted and thus quantify cell types within a given sample. Figure 1 shows an animation of cells flowing and its representative PAFC signal tracing.

== Applications ==
=== Bacteria ===
Over two million bacterial infections occur annually in the United States. With antibiotic resistance increasing treatment of these infections is becoming increasingly difficult making correct antibiotic selection evermore important. Optimal antibiotic selection hangs on the ability to determine the offending bacteria. Traditionally, bacterial speciation is determined by culturing and PCR technologies. These technologies take at least 48 hours and sometimes more. Due to the prolonged timeframe for speciation, providers must select broad-spectrum antibiotics. PAFC can be used to detect bacteria in the blood for more timely antibiotic selection.

The first step in detection with PAFC is marking the bacteria so they have a PA signal to detect. Typically, this is composed of a dye of and a method to attach the dye to the bacteria of interest. Although antibodies have been used in the past, bacteriophages have proven to be cheaper and more stable to produce. Multiple studies have shown the specificity of bacteriophage selection for a bacteria of interest, particularly MRSA, E. Coli, and Salmonella. Dyes vary, but most commonly utilized are gold nanoparticles, Indocyanine green (ICG), and red dye 81. The dyes produce an enhanced signal to enable more sensitive detection. The detection limits found in one study showed approximately 1 bacterial cell per 0.6 μm^{3}. Specific dyes have been tested on animals for toxicity and have not resulted in any clear damage. Although human studies for the detection of bacteria in the blood have yet to be attempted, PAFC may play a role in future applications of bacterial detection.

=== Malaria ===
Malaria causes the deaths of 0.4 million people yearly worldwide. With current medications, early detection is key to preventing these deaths. Current methods include microscopic detection on blood film, serology, or PCR. Lab technicians may lack the experience or the technologies may be too expensive for certain facilities, inevitably missing the diagnosis. Furthermore current methods generally cannot detect malaria at parasites < 50 per microliter and needs 3–4 days post infection before detection can occur. Thus, there is a need for a more automated and sensitive detection method to improve patient outcomes.

PAFC has proven detection limits at much lower than current methods. One study demonstrated a sensitivity of one parasite in 0.16 mL of circulating blood and thus can be detected on day 1–2 post inoculation. Furthermore, studies have demonstrated the feasibility of in vivo detection removing the possibility of missed diagnosis from damaged cells from blood extraction and in-vitro analysis. PAFC detects malaria via the surrogate marker hemozoin, a breakdown product produced by malaria in the merozoite stage. Hemozoin is a great photoacoustic target and responds strongly at wavelengths 671 nm and 820 nm range. Although background signals are produced by hemoglobin within RBCs, infected RBCs (iRBCs) with hemozoin produce a strong signal above hemoglobin at these wavelengths. In vitro methods utilize 50 micrometer capillary tubes with flow of 1 cm/s (in vitro) for detection. Conversely, Menyaev et al. demonstrated the detection of malaria in vivo. Detection was performed on superficial and deep vessels of mice. The superficial vessels provide a higher signal-to-noise ratio (SNR), but are less comparable to that of human vessels. Mice jugular veins and carotid arteries are similar in size to small human vessels which demonstrated higher artifacts due to blood pulsation and respiratory variation, but could be accounted for.

Although PAFC provides a more sensitive detection limit, this method does come with some limitations. As mentioned previously the detection of hemozoin only occurs when the parasites are in the merozoite stage. This limits the detection time frame of the parasites vs detection in the trophozoite stage, but still provides earlier detection than current methods. Second, the vessel sizes tested thus far have only been in mice. Artifacts from deeper vessel analysis in humans may decrease the sensitivity of PAFC making the detection limit less useful than currently suggested. Although challenges still exist, PAFC may play a role in improving diagnosis of Malaria in humans.

=== Circulating Tumor Cells (CTCs) ===
Circulating tumor cells or CTCs are tumor cells that have broken off from their primary tumor and travel in the blood. These CTCs then seed distant sites resulting in metastases. Metastases cause 90% of cancer-related deaths and as such, detection of CTCs is critical to the prevention of mets. Studies have shown earlier detection of CTCs improves treatment and thus longer survival times. (15) Current detection methods include RT-PCR, flow cytometry, optical sensing, cell size filtration among others. These methods are limited due to the sampling size from extracted blood (~5–10 mL) which results in a CTC detection limit of ~ 10 CTC/mL. These methods take hours to days to get results which can result in delayed initiation of treatment.

PAFC may play a role in the future detection of CTCs. In order to prevent the limitation of small volume sampling through the extraction of blood from the patient, PAFC utilizes an in vivo method to monitor a larger volume of blood (i.e. the entire volume). The study demonstrated monitoring a mouse aorta, they were able to visualize the entire mouse blood volume within 1 minute of detection.

CTCs such as melanomas contain an intrinsic chromophore and do not require labeling for detection above the background of hemoglobin. Other tumor cells (such as cancerous squamous cells) can be tagged with nanoparticles to produce a larger PA signal over RBCs for their detection. These methods resulted in an improved detection limit of CTCs. De la Zerda et al. detected CTCs after only 4 days with inoculation of the cancer cells. Their detection limit was determined to be 1 CTC/mL, a 10 fold improvement in sensitivity. Furthermore, the nano-particle labeling was found to be non-toxic and only took 10 minutes to optimally tag the CTCs.

This CTC detection can be used for metastatic screening, but also has therapeutic implications. During tumor resection or manipulation it has been determined that these manipulations release CTCs. PAFC can be used as a way to monitor for the release of these CTCs which then may require treatment in a systematic manner. Due to the non-linear thermoelastic effect from the laser on CTCs/Nanoparticles a higher laser fluence can cause the CTC to rupture without damaging the local RBCs. With reduction of CTCs, this could improve treatment with systemic methods or completely remove the need altogether.

Although there is a large potential for application, there are still areas for improvement. First, PAFC is depth limited and has only been tested in superficial skin of humans which may pose a difficulty for more centrally located tumors such as lung or bowel. Second, although initial mouse models have shown efficacy with nanoparticle labeling, specific cancer type labeling and dye side-effects need to be more deeply studied to assure safety of this imaging modality.
