= THES =

THES may refer to:

- Times Higher Education Supplement (now Times Higher Education), a weekly British magazine based in London
- Toronto Hydro Electric System, the local distributor of electric power in the City of Toronto
- Twin Hickory Elementary School, an elementary school in Henrico County, Virginia

== See also ==
- Thes, a genus of beetles
- Thes (film), 1949 Indian film
- 1 Thes., an abbreviation for the First Epistle to the Thessalonians, a book of the Bible
- 2 Thes., an abbreviation for the Second Epistle to the Thessalonians, a book of the Bible
