= Multispectral optoacoustic tomography =

Imaging technology

- Purpose: imaging technology that generates high-resolution optical images including biological tissues.

Multi-spectral optoacoustic tomography (MSOT), also known as functional photoacoustic tomography (fPAT), is an imaging technology that generates high-resolution optical images in scattering media, including biological tissues. MSOT illuminates tissue with light of transient energy, typically light pulses lasting 1-100 nanoseconds. The tissue absorbs the light pulses, and as a result undergoes thermo-elastic expansion, a phenomenon known as the optoacoustic or photoacoustic effect. This expansion gives rise to ultrasound waves (photoechoes) that are detected and formed into an image. Image formation can be done by means of hardware (e.g. acoustic focusing or optical focusing) or computed tomography (mathematical image formation). Unlike other types of optoacoustic imaging, MSOT involves illuminating the sample with multiple wavelengths, allowing it to detect ultrasound waves emitted by different photoabsorbing molecules in the tissue, whether endogenous (oxygenated and deoxygenated hemoglobin, melanin) or exogenous (imaging probes, nanoparticles). Computational techniques such as spectral unmixing deconvolute the ultrasound waves emitted by these different absorbers, allowing each emitter to be visualized separately in the target tissue. In this way, MSOT can allow visualization of hemoglobin concentration and tissue oxygenation or hypoxia. Unlike other optical imaging methods, MSOT is unaffected by photon scattering and thus can provide high-resolution optical images deep inside biological tissues.

== Description ==
MSOT has been described as a 6-dimensional (6-parametric) method, in which the three geometrical dimensions (x, y, z) are complemented by time, illumination wavelengths and band of ultrasound frequencies detected. MSOT can measure over time, allowing longitudinal studies of dynamic processes. Illumination wavelengths in MSOT can cover the entire spectrum from ultraviolet (UV) to infrared (IR). The wavelength defines the photoabsorbers that can be seen and the imaging depth. High-energy ion beams and energy in the radiofrequency range have also been used. The choice of ultrasound frequency band defines resolution and overall size range of the objects that can be resolved. This choice of frequency band dictates whether the imaging will be in the macroscopic regime, involving resolution of 100-500 microns and penetration depth >10 mm, or mesoscopic range, involving resolution of 1-50 microns and penetration depth <10 mm.[6] Microscopic resolution is also possible using multi-spectral optoacoustics. Like optical microscopy, they use focused light to form images and offers fundamentally the same capabilities (submicrometer resolution, <1mm penetration depth).

MSOT has now been used in a broad range of biological applications, including cardiovascular disease research, neuroimaging and cancer research. The development of real-time hand-held imaging systems has enabled clinical use of MSOT for imaging the breast, vasculature, lymph nodes and skin.

== Etymology ==
Multi-spectral. MSOT collects images at multiple wavelengths and resolves the spectral signatures in each voxel imaged, making it a multi-spectral method. Typically, MSOT is used to generate three images: one anatomical image at a single wavelength, one functional image resolving oxy- and deoxy-hemoglobin concentrations, and a third image resolving additional target photoabsorber(s). These additional photoabsorbers include melanin, fat, water and other endogenous or exogenous agents.

Optoacoustic. This term denotes the combination of optical (Greek, oπτικός) and acoustic (Greek, ακουστικός) energy (or components) in a single modality, which distinguishes optoacoustic imaging from optical imaging. Photoecho denotes the combination of light (Greek, Φως <phos>) and sound ( Ήχος <echos>) or reflection of sound Hχώ <echo>). The term photoacoustic is also widely used, and it denotes the generation of acoustic energy by light. Photoecho and photoacoustic are to optoacoustics what photon is to optics: optical methods rely on photons, whereas optoacoustic methods rely on photoechoes or photoacoustic responses.

Tomography. This term denotes images formed by combining raw measurements from multiple points around the specimen in a mathematical inversion scheme. This process is analogous to x-ray computed tomography, except that tomographic mathematical models describe light and sound propagation in tissues.

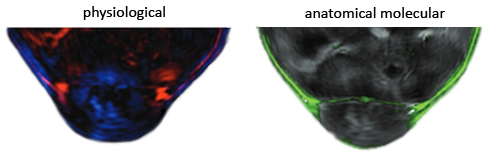

Fig. 1: Operational capabilities of MSOT. Hybrid image showing an optical micrograph of part of a mouse kidney cross-section (gray), overlaid with the distribution of an exogenous fluorescent agent imaged using MSOT (right). Distribution of oxy-hemoglobin (red) and deoxy-hemoglobin (blue) in the tumor, imaged using MSOT (left).

== Operating principles ==
MSOT detects photoechoes, i.e. ultrasound waves generated by thermo-elastic expansion of a sample (e.g. tissue) after absorption of transient electromagnetic energy. Typically, the sample is illuminated with light pulses in the nanosecond range, although intensity-modulated light can also be used. At least some of the electromagnetic energy absorbed by the sample is converted to heat; the resulting temperature rise, on the order of milli-Kelvins, leads to thermo-elastic expansion of the sample. This creates a pressure wave in the form of a broadband ultrasound wave. The ultrasound waves emitted by the sample are detected by transducers positioned near the sample, usually at multiple positions around it. The amplitude of the pressure wave provides information about the local absorption and propagation of energy in the sample, while the time interval between the illumination pulse and arrival of the ultrasound wave at the detector provides information about the distance between the detector and photoecho source. Optoacoustic data collected over time and at multiple positions around the sample are processed using tomographic reconstruction to produce images of the distribution of photoabsorbers in the sample. Data collected after illumination at single wavelengths allow imaging of the distribution of photoabsorbers that share similar absorption characteristics at the given wavelength. Data collected after illumination with multiple wavelengths allow specific distinction of photoabsorbers with different optical absorption spectra, such as oxy- and deoxy-hemoglobin, myoglobin, melanin or exogenous photoabsorbers. The wavelengths of light used to illuminate samples in MSOT are selected based on the absorption characteristics of the target photoabsorbers. To resolve the individual photoabsorbers, images obtained at multiple wavelengths must be further processed using subtraction or spectral unmixing techniques. Background in images can be reduced by exploiting differences in time (baseline subtraction) and in absorption spectra of the various photoabsorbers (spectral unmixing).

== Operational dimensions ==
MSOT has the potential to provide multi-parametric information involving the three spatial dimensions (x, y, z), time, optical wavelength spectrum and ultrasound frequency range. It has therefore been described as a six-dimensional modality. This dimensionality has been made possible by key advances in laser source and detector technology, computed tomography and unmixing techniques. The capabilities and challenges of each MSOT dimension are described below.

=== Volumetric imaging ===
Optoacoustic (photoacoustic) imaging is intrinsically a three-dimensional imaging method, since photoechoes (optoacoustic waves) propagate in all three spatial dimensions. Optimal tomographic imaging is therefore achieved by recording time-resolved pressure waves along a closed surface volumetrically surrounding the target tissue. Typically, three-dimensional imaging systems achieve this by scanning a single ultrasound sensor around the sample, or by using one-dimensional or two-dimensional ultrasound sensor arrays to parallelize detection.

A large amount of data must be collected and processed for truly three-dimensional imaging, necessitating a large detector array, long scanning times, and heavy computational burden. To reduce these requirements, the three-dimensional problem is often simplified to a quasi-two-dimensional problem by using focused ultrasound detectors to limit ultrasound detection to a two-dimensional plane in the illuminated volume. The result is a series of two-dimensional, cross-sectional images, which can be collected in real time and can show quite high in-plane resolution if detector elements are packed at high density around the image plane. Translating the detector along the third dimension then allows volumetric scanning.

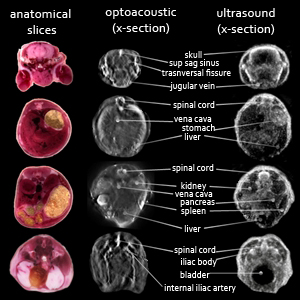

Fig. 2: Volumetric optoacoustic imaging and comparison with reflection-mode ultrasound computed tomography. Cross-sectional tomographic ultrasound (right) and optoacoustic (middle) whole-body image stacks of a living mouse. Histology cross-sections of the tissue shown on the left.

=== Video-rate (real-time) imaging ===
Early optoacoustic imaging involved scanning a single ultrasound detector along one or two dimensions, resulting in acquisition times of several seconds, minutes or longer. This made the technique impractical for in vivo animal imaging or clinical use. Technological advances in detector arrays and analog-to-digital converters allow simultaneous data collection over 512 parallel elements, substantially shortening the amount of time needed to acquire a tomographic dataset, even to the point of allowing video-rate imaging. In addition, lasers have been developed that allow switching between wavelengths within 20 ms, enabling video-rate MSOT. Video-rate imaging not only reduces motion artifacts, but also allows in vivo study of biological processes, even in hand-held mode. It also gives the operator real-time feedback essential for orientation and fast localization of areas of interest.

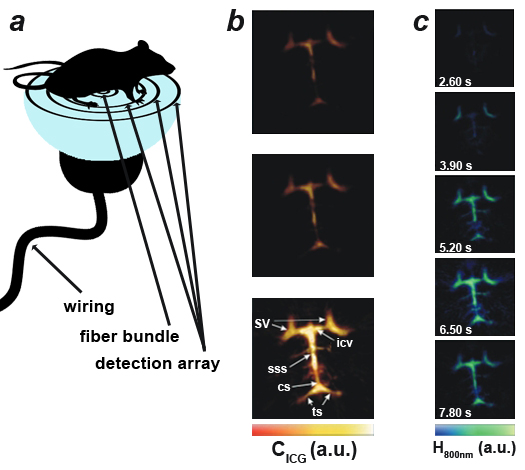

Fig. 3: Five-dimensional imaging of mouse brain perfusion in vivo. (a) Layout of the experimental set-up. (b) Maximal-intensity projections along the axial direction following single-wavelength illumination before (upper) and after injection of two concentrations of contrast agent (10nmol in the middle and 50 nmol lower), indocyanine green. The lower concentration does not provide strong signal over the background signal from blood. Different structures in the mouse brain are indicated: sv, supraorbital veins; icv, inferior cerebral vein; sss, superior sagittal sinus; cs, confluence of sinuses; ts, transverse sinus. (c) Time series of maximal-intensity projections following multi-wavelength illumination after injection of 10 nmol indocyanine green. Inflow of the contrast agent can be followed in real time.

=== Multi-spectral imaging ===
A key strength of MSOT is its ability to resolve the photoechoes obtained in response to excitation with different wavelengths of illuminating light. Since the photoechoes depend on the optical absorption characteristics of molecules within the target tissue (or added to the tissue), MSOT can image the distributions of specific photoabsorbing molecules. The endogenous photoabsorbers most often imaged are oxy- and deoxy-hemoglobin, key players in oxygen metabolism, myoglobin, lipids, melanin and water. Several exogenous contrast agents have also been used in MSOT, including some common histology dyes, fluorescent dyes, novel metal-based agents and non-metallic nanoparticles. Transfecting target tissue with reporter genes to express contrast agents in situ has also been reported, such as transfection with the tyrosinase gene to produce melanin.

Through spectral unmixing and other techniques, MSOT data can be used to generate separate images based on the contrast provided by different photoabsorbers. In other words, a single MSOT data collection run provides separate images showing the distribution of oxy- or deoxy-hemoglobin. These images can be merged to provide a complete picture of tissue oxygenation/hypoxia. By using hemoglobin as an intrinsic oxygen sensor, MSOT is the only method available that can provide high-resolution images of tissue oxygenation without the need for exogenous labels. At the same time, MSOT can image additional endogenous photoabsorbers such as lipids and water, as well as exogenous contrast agents.

=== Imaging with different ultrasound frequency bands (macro-, meso- and microscopy) ===
Photoechoes show an ultra-wide frequency profile, which is determined by the pulse width of the illuminating pulse and the size of the object. Ultimately, though, the frequencies that can be collected and processed for image reconstruction are determined by the ultrasound detector. Macroscopic MSOT typically uses detectors operating in the frequency range from 0.1 to 10 MHz, allowing imaging depths of approximately 1–5 cm and resolution of 0.1–1 mm. Illumination light wavelengths are typically chosen from the near-IR region of the spectrum and spread over the sample to allow deep penetration. Images are then generated using computed tomography. Such macroscopy is useful for animal and human imaging to analyze tissue anatomy, physiology and response to drugs. Regions of interest are approximately 30–50 cm^{3}, and resolution of 200-300 microns is typical.

Ultrasound detectors have been developed that collect bandwidths of 10-200 MHz or wider, which allows unprecedented mesoscopy at tissue depths of 0.1–1 cm with resolution that can exceed 10 microns even at depths of several millimeters. Illumination light is typically unfocused and selected from the visible and near-IR regions of the spectrum. Images are generated using computed tomography. Such mesoscopy can analyze morphology and biological processes such as inflammation in greater detail than macroscopy, revealing, for example, microvasculature networks in skin and epithelial tissues or the microenvironment within a tumor. Regions of interest are approximately 50 mm^{3}, and resolution of 5-30 microns is typical.

The possibility of applying optoacoustics to the microscopic regime has been suggested. This involves scanning focused light on the tissue surface. The imaging depth (typically <1 mm) and quality of the resulting image are limited by optical diffraction and scattering, not by ultrasound diffraction. In other words, optoacoustic microscopy has the same limitations as conventional optical microscopy. Together, however, the two microscopies can provide more information than either on its own.

== Operational characteristics ==
=== Modes of operation ===
MSOT can operate in three imaging modes:

1. anatomical imaging, which can be performed using a single wavelength of illuminating light and at multiple scales. This mode has been used to visualize various tissue structures and organs in laboratory animals and humans, including vasculature, kidney, heart, liver, brain and muscle.
2. functional/dynamic imaging, which can be performed at video rates to reveal changes in tissue contrast caused by hemodynamics, motion such as vessel pulsation, and uptake of drugs (pharmacodynamics).
3. biological / molecular imaging, which exploits the multi-spectral capability of MSOT. This mode has been used to visualize tissue oxygenation, reporter genes, fluorescent proteins and various exogenous agents (e.g. fluorescent dyes, nanoparticles, target-specific agents) in laboratory animals and humans.

=== Challenges to MSOT-based quantification ===
MSOT provides anatomical, dynamic and molecular information, but quantifying the features of MSOT images is not straightforward because constituents of the target tissue absorb and scatter the illuminating light. As a result, the illuminating light is attenuated as one moves deeper into the tissue, and the extent of attenuation depends on wavelength. The measured spectral signature of photoabsorbers inside tissue may therefore differ from the absorption spectrum of the same molecule measured inside the cuvette of a spectrophotometer. This discrepancy, termed "spectral coloring", depends on the number and types of photoabsorbers in the propagation path. Spectral coloring poses a challenge to spectral unmixing, which requires accurate knowledge of the absorption spectrum. Moreover, optoacoustic imaging, with a resolution in the range of 1-100 μm, cannot resolve individual photoabsorbing molecules. As a result, the spectral response of the photoabsorber of interest is a linear combination of the spectral responses of background tissue constituents, such as oxy- and deoxy-hemoglobin, melanin, water, lipids and unknown metabolites, which further complicates unmixing. Recently, eigenspectra MSOT has been developed to model more accurately the spectral responses of different photoabsorbers in three-dimensional tissue. This may help improve spectral unmixing and therefore image quality.

=== Sensitivity ===
MSOT can resolve various optoacoustic moieties based on their absorption spectrum, including nanoparticles, dyes and fluorochromes. Most fluorochromes are optimized for fluorescence emission and are sub-optimal for optoacoustic detection, because after absorbing the illuminating energy, they tend to emit fluorescence rather than convert it to heat and generate a photoecho. Dyes with higher absorption cross-sections generate stronger optoacoustic signals.

Therefore, the sensitivity of MSOT depends on the contrast agent used, its distribution and accumulation in the target tissue, and its resistance to photobleaching by the illuminating light. Sensitivity also depends on the ultrasound detector employed, the amount of light energy applied, the voxel size and spectral unmixing method. As imaging depth increases, light and ultrasound attenuation together reduce the optoacoustic signal and therefore the overall detection sensitivity. Ultrasound attenuation is frequency-dependent: higher frequencies are attenuated faster with increasing depth. Selecting ultrasound detectors that are most sensitive at the appropriate frequency can improve sensitivity at the target imaging depth, but at the cost of spatial resolution.

Earlier calculations predicted that MSOT should be able to detect concentrations of organic fluorochromes as low as 5 nM. These calculations did not properly account for frequency-dependent attenuation of ultrasound in tissue or for the requirements of spectral unmixing. Experimental results suggest an in vivo detection sensitivity of 0.1-1 μM for organic dyes with a minimum detectable optical absorption coefficient of 0.1–1 cm^{−1}, such as indocyanine green and Alexa fluochromes. Advanced spectral unmixing methods based on statistical detection schemes can improve MSOT sensitivity.

== Contrast and applications ==
Optoacoustic imaging in general, and MSOT in particular, have been applied to various analyses of animal models, including imaging of organs, pathology, functional processes and bio-distribution. This range of applications demonstrates the flexibility of MSOT, which reflects the range of contrast agents available. Practically every molecule that absorbs light and converts it to a pressure wave has the potential to be detected with optoacoustics. Contrast agents absorbing light in the near-IR are particularly attractive, because they enable imaging at greater depth.

=== Endogenous contrast agents ===
Hemoglobin is the dominant absorber of light in the visible and near-IR part of the optical spectrum and is commonly used for optoacoustic imaging. Endogenous contrast provided by hemoglobin allows sensitive imaging of vascular anatomy at various scales. Using MSOT further allows the distinction between oxygenation states of hemoglobin, enabling label-free assessment of tissue oxygenation and hypoxia, both of which are useful parameters in many pathologies and functional studies. Hemoglobin-based imaging to resolve vascular abnormalities and oxygenation status may be useful for various applications, including perfusion imaging, inflammation imaging, and tumor detection and characterization.

Melanin is another important endogenous absorber; it absorbs over a broad range of wavelengths in the visible and near-IR range, with absorption decreasing at longer wavelengths. Optoacoustic imaging of melanin has been used to assess the depth of melanoma ingrowth inside epithelial tissue and to assess the metastatic status of sentinel lymph nodes in melanoma patients. It can also detect circulating melanoma cells.

MSOT can detect several other endogenous tissue absorbers, as long as the correct wavelength range is used to illuminate the sample. Lipids can be imaged at near-IR wavelengths, with the absorption peak occurring at 930 nm. Water absorbs strongly at near-IR wavelengths longer than 900 nm, with a strong peak at 980 nm. Bilirubin and cytochromes can be imaged at blue wavelengths. UV absorption by DNA has also been exploited to image cell nuclei.

=== Exogenous contrast agents ===
A multitude of exogenous contrast agents have been developed, or are under development, for optoacoustics. These contrast agents should have an absorption spectrum different from that of endogenous tissue absorbers, so that they can be separated from other background absorbers using spectral unmixing. Different classes of exogenous contrast agents exist. Organic dyes, such as the fluorochromes indocyanine green and methylene blue, are non-specific, approved for clinical use, and suitable for perfusion imaging. They typically have low quantum yield, so they convert a large portion of absorbed energy into heat and thus photoechoes. Since these dyes can be imaged based on optoacoustics and fluorescence, the two types of microscopies can be used to complement and verify each other. In fact, organic dyes are generally well characterized because of their widespread use in fluorescence imaging. Photosensitizers, already in clinical use for photodynamic therapy, can be detected using MSOT, allowing analysis of their pharmacokinetics and bio-distribution in vivo. Light-absorbing nanoparticles offer potential advantages over organic dyes because of their ability to produce stronger photoechoes and their lower photosensitivity. One disadvantage is that they must be approved individually for human use because their safety has not been well established. Gold nanoparticles, silver nanoparticles, carbon nanotubes, and iron-oxide particles have been used for optoacoustic imaging in animals. Gold nanoparticles generate strong optoacoustic signals due to plasmon resonance, and their absorption spectrum can be tuned by modifying their shape. Some iron oxide nanoparticles, such as SPIO, have already been approved for the clinic as MRI contrast agents.

Targeted contrast agents combine a dye or nanoparticle with a targeting ligand to provide MSOT contrast at specific tissues or in the presence of specific cellular or molecular processes. Such agents have been used in MSOT imaging of integrins within tumors in animals. Targeted agents can also be activatable, such that their absorption spectrum changes as the result of a change in the microenvironment. For example, a contrast agent activatable by matrix metalloproteinase (MMP) cleavage has been used to image MMP activity within thyroid tumors in mice.

Fluorescent proteins that are already widespread, powerful tools for biomedical research, such as green fluorescent protein, can also be visualized using MSOT. Newly developed fluorescent proteins that absorb in the near-IR range (e.g. red fluorescent protein) allow imaging deep inside tissues. MSOT based on in situ expression of fluorescent proteins can take advantage of tissue- and development-specific promoters, allowing imaging of specific parts of an organism at specific stages of development. For example, eGFP and mCherry fluorescent proteins have been imaged in model organisms such as Drosophila melanogaster pupae and adult zebrafish, and mCherry has been imaged in tumor cells in the mouse brain. This transgenic approach is not limited to fluorescent proteins: infecting tissue with a vaccinia virus carrying the tyrosinase gene allows in situ production of melanin, which generates strong optoacoustic signal for MSOT.

== Emerging applications ==
Because of its ability to provide spatial and spectral resolution in real time on multiple scales, optoacoustic imaging in general and MSOT in particular are likely to play an important role in clinical imaging and management of cancer, cardiovascular disease and inflammation. MSOT presents numerous advantages over other radiology modalities because of its ability to resolve oxygenated and deoxygenated hemoglobin, its compatibility with a broad array of exogenous contrast agents, its scalability and its ability to image rapidly even below the tissue surface.

=== Imaging of pharmacokinetics ===
MSOT can track the fate of administered agents in blood circulation, allowing real-time, in vivo analysis of pharmacokinetics. This may reduce the numbers of animals needed in biomedical research.

=== Breast cancer imaging ===
Several optoacoustic studies have aimed to improve on the poor sensitivity of X-ray mammography in dense breast tissue and the low specificity of ultrasound imaging. MSOT may miss fewer malignancies in dense breast tissue than these conventional modalities because optoacoustic contrast is unaffected by breast density. MSOT studies of breast cancer typically focus on detecting the increased vascular density and correspondingly high hemoglobin concentration thought to occur in and around tumors. The flexibility of MSOT may also allow imaging of other tissue and cancer biomarkers not detectable with current methods.

=== Vascular disease imaging ===
The hemoglobin distribution in carotid arteries of healthy humans has recently been imaged in real time using a hand-held device similar to diagnostic ultrasound systems currently in the clinic. The ability to image blood vessels in hands and feet may be useful for assessing peripheral vascular disease.

Fig. 4: MSOT of human vasculature. The handheld MSOT probe shown here to measure photoechoes from hemoglobin, allows more sensitive detection of small blood vessels than Doppler ultrasound already in the clinic. Different structures are indicated: ADP, dorsalis pedis artery; ATP, tibialis posterior artery; MH, medial hallux; DH, distal hallux.

=== Skin imaging ===
Optoacoustic mesoscopy is suitable for imaging skin lesions. Studies in preclinical models have imaged subcutaneous lesions and their vascular networks and demonstrated the potential to reveal lesion details such as depth, vascular morphology, oxygenation and melanin content. Combining optoacoustic mesoscopy with exogenous agents may provide further useful information.

=== Endoscopy ===
Light delivery and ultrasound detection can be miniaturized to create optoacoustic endoscopy systems for gastrointestinal applications. A system combining MSOT and ultrasound endoscopy has been used to image the esophagus and colon in rats and rabbits. The MSOT images revealed vascular features and hemoglobin oxygenation that was not detectable by ultrasound. Moreover, optoacoustic endoscopy can detect the exogenous dye Evans blue after injection into the lymphatic system. Ongoing technological progress is expected to allow optoacoustic imaging of the gastrointestinal tract in humans in the near future, which may allow three-dimensional analysis of suspicious lesions, providing more complete information than white light endoscopy.

=== Intravascular imaging ===
Miniaturized optoacoustic devices are also expected to offer possibilities for intravascular imaging [72-74], improving the detection of atherosclerosis and stent-related biomarkers. Optoacoustic imaging is likely to be suited to this application, since it can detect lipids, neovasculature, hemoglobin oxygenation and contrast agents that mark inflammation.

=== Examination of metastatic status of sentinel lymph nodes ===
Melanoma metastasizes early into regional lymph nodes, so excision and analysis of so-called sentinel lymph nodes is important for treatment planning and prognosis assessment. To identify the sentinel lymph node for excision, a gamma-emitting radiotracer is injected inside the primary tumor and allowed to accumulate inside the sentinel lymph node. MSOT may provide a non-radioactive, non-invasive alternative for examination of the metastatic status of the sentinel lymph node. Initial studies have shown that MSOT can detect sentinel lymph nodes based on indocyanine green (ICG) accumulation after injection in the tumor, as well as melanoma metastasis inside the lymph nodes.

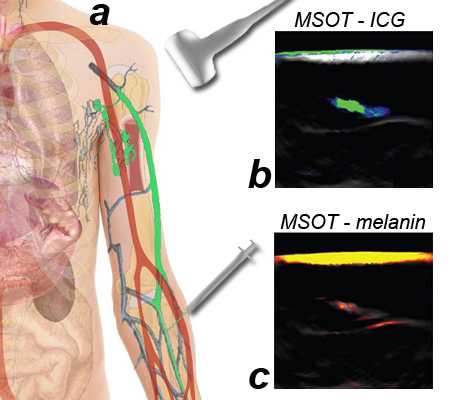

Fig. 5: MSOT for determination of the metastatic status of sentinel lymph nodes in melanoma patients. (A) Indocyanine green (ICG) is injected and accumulates inside the sentinel lymph node, which is detected using a hand-held two-dimensional MSOT device. (b) MSOT images of the ICG accumulating in the sentinel lymph node (in color), overlaid on a background image of tissue illuminated at a single wavelength. Each image came from a different patient. (c) MSOT imaging of melanin (in color) overlaid on a background image of tissue. The first image shows a patient without melanoma metastasis. The second image shows a patient with melanoma metastasis inside the sentinel lymph node. In both cases, strong melanin signal from the skin can be seen

=== Intraoperative imaging ===
Optoacoustic imaging in general and MSOT in particular may address a number of challenges for surgical procedures by providing real-time visualization below the tissue surface. In particular, optoacoustic imaging can provide immediate information on the perfusion status of tissues based on analysis of hemoglobin dynamics and oxygenation. This may, for example, detect areas at high risk of anastomotic leakage under ischemic conditions in the colon or esophagus, allowing preventive measures to be taken.

== Possible use for biopsy-free detection of lymph node metastasis ==
MSOT can detect exogenous contrast agents up to a depth of 5 cm in tissue if the overlaying tissue is sufficiently compressed. It has been evaluated on 500 removed lymph nodes to check for melanin as a sign of melanoma metastasis.

== See also ==
- Photoacoustic tomography
- Photoacoustic imaging in biomedicine
- Optoacoustic imaging
