= Photoacoustic effect =

Physical phenomenon

The photoacoustic effect or optoacoustic effect is the formation of sound waves following light absorption in a material sample. In order to obtain this effect the light intensity must vary, either periodically (modulated light) or as a single flash (pulsed light). The photoacoustic effect is quantified by measuring the formed sound (pressure changes) with appropriate detectors, such as microphones or piezoelectric sensors. The time variation of the electric output (current or voltage) from these detectors is the photoacoustic signal. These measurements are useful to determine certain properties of the studied sample. For example, in photoacoustic spectroscopy, the photoacoustic signal is used to obtain the actual absorption of light in either opaque or transparent objects. It is useful for substances in extremely low concentrations, because very strong pulses of light from a laser can be used to increase sensitivity and very narrow wavelengths can be used for specificity. Furthermore, photoacoustic measurements serve as a valuable research tool in the study of the heat evolved in photochemical reactions (see: photochemistry), particularly in the study of photosynthesis.

Most generally, electromagnetic radiation of any kind can give rise to a photoacoustic effect. This includes the whole range of electromagnetic frequencies, from gamma radiation and X-rays to microwave and radio. Still, much of the reported research and applications, utilizing the photoacoustic effect, is concerned with the near ultraviolet/visible and infrared spectral regions.

== History ==
The discovery of the photoacoustic effect dates back to 1880, when Alexander Graham Bell was experimenting with long-distance sound transmission. Through his invention, called "photophone", he transmitted vocal signals by reflecting sun-light from a moving mirror to a selenium solar cell receiver. As a byproduct of this investigation, he observed that sound waves were produced directly from a solid sample when exposed to beam of sunlight that was rapidly interrupted with a rotating slotted wheel. He noticed that the resulting acoustic signal was dependent on the type of the material and correctly reasoned that the effect was caused by the absorbed light energy, which subsequently heats the sample. Later Bell showed that materials exposed to the non-visible (ultra-violet and infra-red) portions of the solar spectrum can also produce sounds and invented a device, which he called "spectrophone", to apply this effect for spectral identification of materials. Bell himself and later John Tyndall and Wilhelm Röntgen extended these experiments, demonstrating the same effect in liquids and gases. However, the results were too crude, dependent on ear detection, and this technique was soon abandoned. The application of the photoacoustic effect had to wait until the development of sensitive sensors and intense light sources. In 1938 Mark Leonidovitch Veingerov revived the interest in the photoacoustic effect, being able to use it in order to measure very small carbon dioxide concentration in nitrogen gas (as low as 0.2% in volume). Since then research and applications grew faster and wider, acquiring several fold more detection sensitivity.

While the heating effect of the absorbed radiation was considered to be the prime cause of the photoacoustic effect, it was shown in 1978 that gas evolution resulting from a photochemical reaction can also cause a photoacoustic effect. Independently, considering the apparent anomalous behaviour of the photoacoustic signal from a plant leaf, which could not be explained solely by the heating effect of the exciting light, led to the cognition that photosynthetic oxygen evolution is normally a major contributor to the photoacoustic signal in this case.

== Physical mechanisms ==
=== Photothermal mechanism ===
Although much of the literature on the subject is concerned with just one mechanism, there are actually several different mechanisms that produce the photoacoustic effect. The primary universal mechanism is photothermal, based on the heating effect of the light and the consequent expansion of the light-absorbing material. In detail, the photothermal mechanism consists of the following stages:

1. conversion of the absorbed pulsed or modulated radiation into heat energy.
2. temporal changes of the temperatures at the loci where radiation is absorbed – rising as radiation is absorbed and falling when radiation stops and the system cools.
3. expansion and contraction following these temperature changes, which are "translated" to pressure changes. The pressure changes, which occur in the region where light was absorbed, propagate within the sample body and can be sensed by a sensor coupled directly to it. Commonly, for the case of a condensed phase sample (liquid, solid), pressure changes are rather measured in the surrounding gaseous phase (commonly air), formed there by the diffusion of the thermal pulsations.

The main physical picture, in this case, envisions the original temperature pulsations as origins of propagating temperature waves ("thermal waves"), which travel in the condensed phase, ultimately reaching the surrounding gaseous phase. The resulting temperature pulsations in the gaseous phase are the prime cause of the pressure changes there. The amplitude of the traveling thermal wave decreases strongly (exponentially) along its propagation direction, but if its propagation distance in the condensed phase is not too long, its amplitude near the gaseous phase is sufficient to create detectable pressure changes. This property of the thermal wave confers unique features to the detection of light absorption by the photoacoustic method. The temperature and pressure changes involved are minute, compared to everyday scale – typical order of magnitude for the temperature changes, using ordinary light intensities, is about micro- to millidegrees and for the resulting pressure changes is about nano- to microbars.

The photothermal mechanism manifests itself, besides the photoacoustic effect, also by other physical changes, notably emission of infra-red radiation and changes in the refraction index. Correspondingly, it may be detected by various other means, described by terms such as "photothermal radiometry", "thermal lens" and "thermal beam deflection" (popularly also known as "mirage" effect, see Photothermal spectroscopy). These methods parallel the photoacoustic detection. However, each method has its special range of application.

=== Other ===
While the photothermal mechanism is universal, there could exist additional other mechanisms, superimposed on the photothermal mechanism, which may contribute significantly to the photoacoustic signal. These mechanisms are generally related to photophysical processes and photochemical reactions following light absorption: (1) change in the material balance of the sample or the gaseous phase around the sample; (2) change in the molecular organization, which results in molecular volume changes. Most prominent examples for these two kinds of mechanisms are in photosynthesis.

The first mechanism above is mostly conspicuous in a photosynthesizing plant leaf. There, the light induced oxygen evolution causes pressure changes in the air phase, resulting in a photoacoustic signal, which is comparable in magnitude to that caused by the photothermal mechanism. This mechanism was tentatively named "photobaric". The second mechanism shows up in photosynthetically active sub-cell complexes in suspension (e.g. photosynthetic reaction centers). There, the electric field which is formed in the reaction center, following the light induced electron transfer process, causes a micro electrostriction effect with a change in the molecular volume. This, in turn, induces a pressure wave which propagates in the macroscopic medium. Another case for this mechanism is Bacteriorhodopsin proton pump. Here the light induced change in the molecular volume is caused by conformational changes that occur in this protein following light absorption.

== Detection of the photoacoustic effect ==
In applying the photoacoustic effect there exist various modes of measurement. Gaseous samples or condensed phase samples, where the pressure is measured in the surrounding gaseous phase, are usually probed with a microphone. The useful applicable time-scale in this case is in the millisecond to sub-second scale. Most often, In this case, the exciting light is continuously chopped or modulated at a certain frequency (mostly in the range between ca. 10–10000 Hz) and the modulated photoacoustic signal is analyzed with a lock-in amplifier for its amplitude and phase, or for the inphase and quadrature components. When the pressure is measured within the condensed phase of the probed specimen, one utilizes piezoelectric sensors inserted into or coupled to the specimen itself. In this case the time scale is between less than nanoseconds to many microseconds The photoacoustic signal, obtained from the various pressure sensors, depends on the physical properties of the system, the mechanism that creates the photoacoustic signal, the light-absorbing material, the dynamics of the excited state relaxation and the modulation frequency or the pulse profile of the radiation, as well as the sensor properties. This calls for appropriate procedures to (i) separate between the signals due to different mechanisms and (ii) to obtain the time dependence of the heat evolution (in the case of the photothermal mechanism) or the oxygen evolution (in the case of the photobaric mechanism in photosynthesis) or the time dependence of the volume changes, from the time dependence of the resulting photoacoustic signal.

== Applications ==
Considering the photothermal mechanism alone, the photoacoustic signal is useful in measuring the light absorption spectrum, particularly for transparent samples where the light absorption is very small. In this case the ordinary method of absorption spectroscopy, based on difference of the intensities of a light beam before and after its passage through the sample, is not practical. In photoacoustic spectroscopy there is no such limitation. The signal is directly related to the light absorption and the light intensity. Dividing the signal spectrum by the light intensity spectrum can give a relative percent absorption spectrum, which can be calibrated to yield absolute values. This is very useful to detect very small concentrations of various materials. Photoacoustic spectroscopy is also useful for the opposite case of opaque samples, where the absorption is essentially complete. In an arrangement where a sensor is placed in a gaseous phase above the sample and the light impinges the sample from above, the photoacoustic signal results from an absorption zone close to the surface. A typical parameter which governs the signal in this case is the "thermal diffusion length", which depends on the material and the modulation frequency and ordinarily is in the order of several micrometers. The signal is related to the light absorbed in the small distance of the thermal diffusion length, allowing the determination of the absorption spectrum. This allows also to separately analyze a surface that is distinct from the bulk. By varying the modulation frequency and wavelength of the probing radiation one essentially varies the probed depth, which results in the possibility of depth profiling and photoacoustic imaging, which discloses inhomogeneities within the sample. This analysis includes also the possibility to determine the thermal properties from the photoacoustic signal.

Recently, the photoacoustic approach has been utilized to quantitatively measure macromolecules, such as proteins. The photoacoustic immunoassay labels and detects target proteins using nanoparticles that can generate strong acoustic signals. The photoacoustics-based protein analysis has also been applied for point-of-care testings.

Another application of the photoacoustic effect is its ability to estimate the chemical energies stored in various steps of a photochemical reaction. Following light absorption photophysical and photochemical conversions occur, which store part of the light energy as chemical energy. Energy storage leads to less heat evolution. The resulting smaller photoacoustic signal thus gives a quantitative estimate of the extent of the energy storage. For transient species this requires the measurement of the signal in the relevant time scale and the capability to extract from the temporal part of the signal the time-dependent heat evolution, by proper deconvolution. There are numerous examples for this application. A similar application is the study of the conversion of light energy to electrical energy in solar cells. A special example is the application of the photoacoustic effect in photosynthesis research.

== Photoacoustic effect in photosynthesis ==
Photosynthesis is a very suitable platform to be investigated by the photoacoustic effect, providing many examples to its various uses. As noted above, the photoacoustic signal from wet photosynthesizing specimens (e.g. microalgae in suspension, sea weed) is principally photothermal. The photoacoustic signal from spongy structures (leaves, lichens) is a combination of photothermal and photobaric (gas evolution or uptake) contributions. The photoacoustic signal from preparations which carry out the primary electron transfer reactions (e.g. reaction centers) is a combination of photothermal and molecular volume changes contributions. In each case, respectively, photoacoustic measurements provided information on

- Energy storage (i.e. the fraction of light energy which is converted to chemical energy in the photosynthetic process;
- The extent and dynamics of the gas evolution and uptake from leaves or lichens. Most usually it is photosynthetic oxygen evolution which contributes to the photoacoustic signal; Carbon dioxide uptake is a slow process and does not show up in photoacoustic measurements. Under very specific conditions, however, the photoacoustic signal becomes transiently negative, presumably reflecting oxygen uptake. However, this needs more verification;
- Molecular volume changes, which occur during the primary steps of photosynthetic electron transfer.

These measurements provided information related to the mechanism of photosynthesis, as well as give indications on the intactness and health of the specimen.

Examples are: (a) the energetics of the primary electron transfer processes, obtained from the energy storage and molecular volume change measured under sub-microsecond flashes; (b) The characteristics of the 4-step oxidation cycle in photosystem II, obtained for leaves by monitoring photoacoustic pulsed signals and their oscillatory behavior under repetitive exciting light flashes; (c) the characteristics of photosystem I and photosystem II of photosynthesis (absorption spectrum, light distribution to the two photosystems) and their interactions. This is obtained by using continuously modulated light of a certain specific wavelength to excite the photoacoustic signal and measure changes in energy storage and oxygen evolution caused by background light at various chosen wavelengths.

In general, photoacoustic measurements of energy storage require a reference sample for comparison. It is a sample with exactly the same light absorption (at the given excitation wavelength) but which completely degrades all the absorbed light into heat within the time resolution of the measurement. It is lucky that photosynthetic systems are self-calibrating, providing such a reference in one sample, as follows: One compares two signals: one, which is obtained with the probing modulated/pulsed light alone and the other when a steady non-modulated light (referred to as background light), which is strong enough to drive photosynthesis into saturation, is added. The added steady light does not produce any photoacoustic effect by itself, but changes the photoacoustic response due to the modulated/pulsed probing light. The resulting signal serves as a reference to all other measurements in absence of the background light. The photothermal part of the reference signal is maximal, since at photosynthetic saturation no energy is stored. At the same time the contribution of the other mechanisms tends to zero at saturation. Thus the reference signal is proportional to the total absorbed light energy.

In order to separate and define the photobaric and photothermal contributions in spongy samples (leaves, lichens) one uses the following properties of the photoacoustic signal: (1) At low frequencies (below roughly 100 Hz) the photobaric part of the photoacoustic signal may be quite large and the total signal decreases under the background light. The photobaric signal is obtained in principle from the difference of signals (the total signal minus the reference signal, after a correction to account for the energy storage). (2) At sufficiently high frequencies, however, the photobaric signal is very much attenuated in comparison with the photothermal component and can be neglected. Also, no photobaric signal can be observed even at low frequencies in a leaf with its inner air space filled with water. This is true also in live algal thalli, suspensions of microalgae and photosynthetic bacteria. This is because the photobaric signal depends on oxygen diffusion from the photosynthetic membranes to the air phase, and is largely attenuated as the diffusion distance in the aqueous medium increases. In all the above instances when no photobaric signal is observed one may determine the energy storage by comparing the photoacoustic signal obtained with the probing light alone, to the reference signal. The parameters obtained from the above measurements are used in a variety of ways. Energy storage and the intensity of the photobaric signal are related to the efficiency of photosynthesis and can be used to monitor and follow the health of photosynthesizing organisms. They are also used to obtain mechanistic insight on the photosynthetic process: light of different wavelengths allows one to obtain the efficiency spectrum of photosynthesis, the light distribution between the two photosystems of photosynthesis and to identify different taxa of phytoplankton. The use of pulsed lasers gives thermodynamic and kinetic information on the primary electron transfer steps of photosynthesis.

=== Photoacoustic Immunoassay ===
The photoacoustic immunoassay measures low-frequency acoustic signals generated by metal nanoparticle tags. Illuminated by a modulated light at a plasmon resonance wavelength, the nanoparticles generate strong acoustic signal, which can be measured using a microphone. The photoacoustic immunoassay can be applied to lateral flow tests, which use colloidal nanoparticles.

== See also ==
- Microwave auditory effect
- Photoacoustic spectroscopy
- Photoacoustic imaging
- Photoacoustic microscopy
- Photoacoustic flow cytometry
- Photoacoustic Doppler effect
- Multispectral optoacoustic tomography
- Golay cell
