= Terahertz =

Terahertz or THz may refer to:

- Terahertz (unit), a unit of frequency, defined as one trillion (10^{12}) cycles per second or 10^{12} hertz
- Terahertz radiation, electromagnetic waves within the ITU-designated band of frequencies from 0.3 to 3 terahertz
- Terahertz spectroscopy and technology
- Intel TeraHertz, a transistor design

== See also ==
- Terahertz gap, a band of frequencies in the terahertz region of the electromagnetic spectrum
