= Christian Yves Dominique Pichot =

Electrical engineer

Christian Yves Dominique Pichot is an electrical engineer at the French National Center for Scientific Research (CNRS) in Valbonne, France. He was named a Fellow of the Institute of Electrical and Electronics Engineers (IEEE) in 2013 for his work in microwave tomography and antenna designs.
