= Andreas Reigber =

German electrical engineer

Andreas Reigber is an electrical engineer from the German Aerospace Center (DLR) in Wessling, Germany. He was named a Fellow of the Institute of Electrical and Electronics Engineers (IEEE) in 2016. for his contributions to SAR tomography and airborne multi-band SAR.
