= Biceps tendon rupture =

Complete or partial rupture of a tendon of the biceps brachii muscle

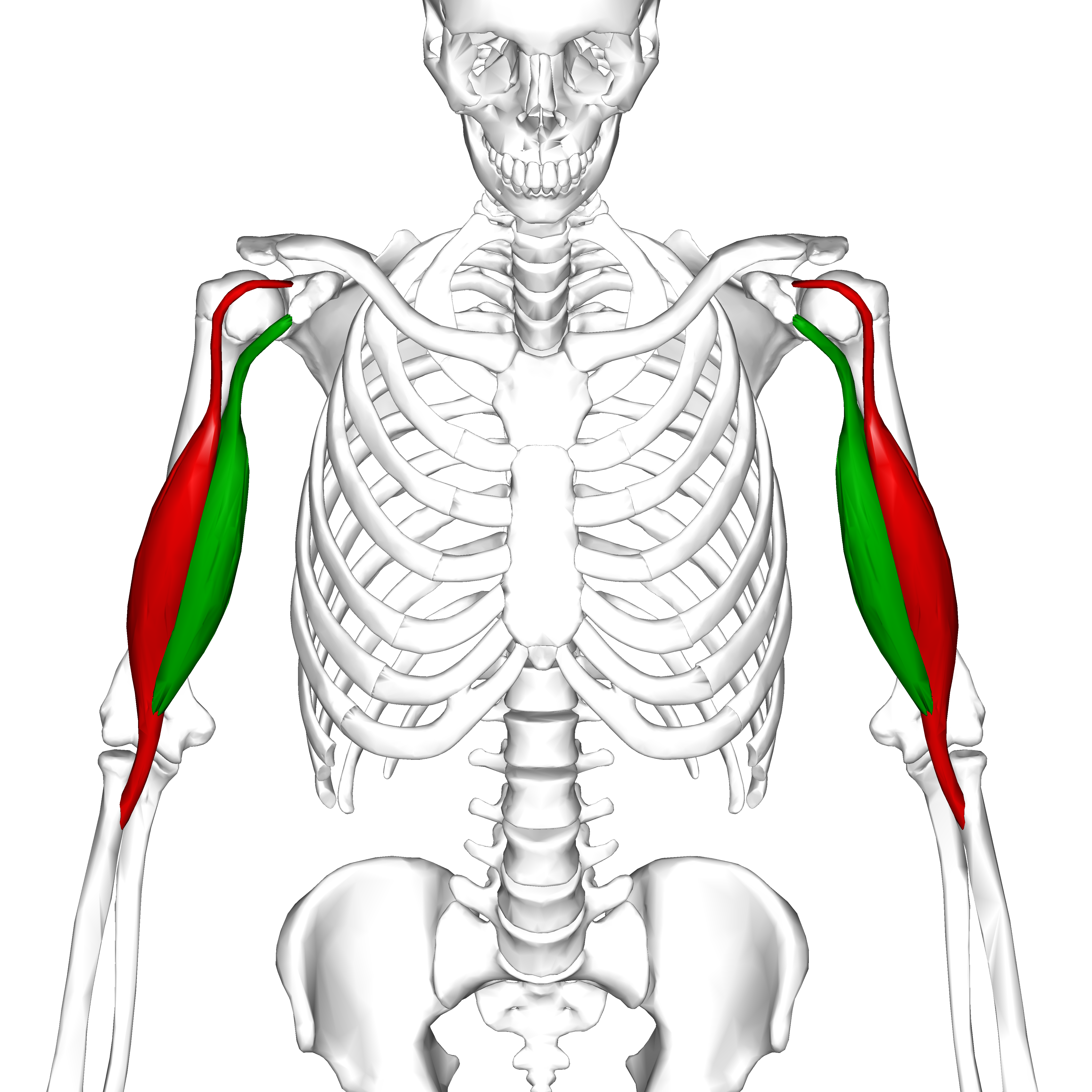
- This image show the biceps brachii from an anterior perspective. The biceps brachii primarily serves to supinate the forearm at the elbow joint. The muscle belly is composed of two heads. The short head is more medial and highlighted in green. The long head is more lateral and highlighted in red.
- Specialty: Orthopedics
- Symptoms: Audible "pop" at the time of injury, upper arm pain, bruising, swelling
- Causes: Hyper-extension of the elbow.
- Risk factors: Male sex; smoking; obesity; corticosteroids
- Diagnostic method: Physical exam, ultrasound
- Treatment: Conservative care; surgical re-attachment followed by physical therapy
- Frequency: 2.55 per 100,000 patient-years.

A biceps tendon rupture or bicep tear is a complete or partial rupture of a tendon of the biceps brachii muscle. It can affect any of the three biceps brachii tendons - the proximal tendon of the short head of the muscle belly, the proximal tendon of the long head of the muscle belly, or the distal tendon. The characteristic finding of a biceps tendon rupture is the Popeye sign. Patients often report an audible pop at the time of injury as well as pain, bruising, and swelling. Provocative physical exam maneuvers to assess for a rupture include Ludington's test, Hook test, and the Ruland biceps squeeze test. Treatment and prognosis are highly dependent on the site of the injury described in further detail below.

== Signs and symptoms ==
When a tendon of the biceps brachii ruptures, the muscle belly retracts, meaning that it goes from a lengthened position under tension at two attachments to a shortened position with a single attachment. This shortened position forms a bulge which is referred to as "Popeye's deformity," due to its similarity in appearance to the cartoon character Popeye.

Other signs at the time of injury may include ecchymosis, swelling, and/or a sharp pain accompanied by an audible popping sound. The pain may persist for prolonged periods of time depending on the response to the individualized treatment plan.

Distal tendon rupture will cause significant weakness with respect to forearm supination and flexion, whereas proximal tendon ruptures do not cause significant weakness as a result of their dual proximal tendinous attachments serving as redundancy.

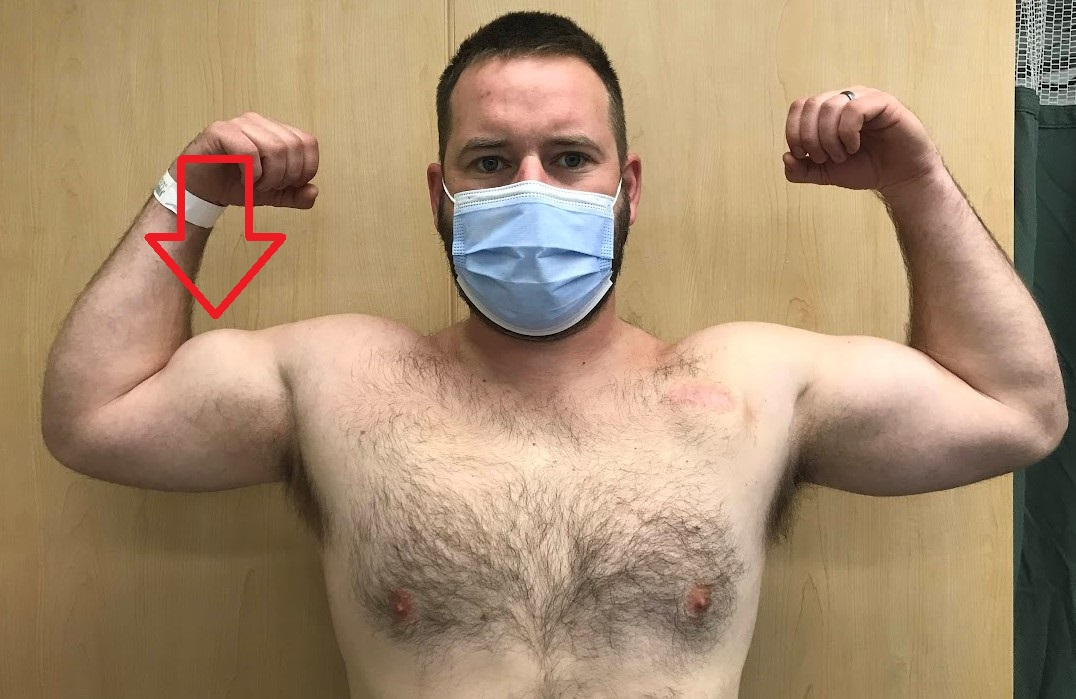
This image shows a biceps brachii tendon rupture on the right arm. The rupture occurred in a proximal biceps tendon, resulting in retraction distally. This is one of the two forms of the "Popeye deformity."

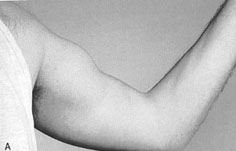
This image shows a biceps brachii tendon rupture on the left arm. The rupture occurred in the distal biceps tendon, resulting in retraction of the muscle belly proximally. This is the other form of the "Popeye deformity."

== Diagnosis ==
=== History ===
Patient may describe that they felt a sudden audible popping sound under strenuous load at the time of injury. Immediately after the injury, they may notice some of the signs and symptoms listed in the section above, including pain, ecchymosis, and swelling. Patient with suspected rupture should also be asked about risk factors including corticosteroid use, athletic history, and pre-existing shoulder impingement syndromes or rotator cuff tears.

=== Physical ===
Upon physical examination, an initial visual inspection may reveal the "Popeye's deformity," ecchymosis, and swelling. Physical manipulation may reveal weakness in supination and elbow flexion. Provocative physical exam maneuvers include the Hook test, Ludington's test, and the Ruland biceps squeeze test. Given the nature of each exam, the Ludington's test is a provocative physical exam maneuver to palpate for a proximal tendon rupture, whereas the Hook test and the Ruland biceps squeeze test are used to palpate for a distal tendon rupture.

Ludington's test - The patient is asked to place both hands on his head and interlock his fingers. Then he is asked to flex both biceps. Meanwhile, the physician will palpate both bicipital grooves for the proximal tendon of the long head of the biceps. He will be unable to palpate the tendon within the groove on the arm with the ruptured tendon, but will be able to palpate it within the unaffected arm.

Hook test - The physician uses his finger to use a lateral approach to "hook" underneath the patient's flexed distal tendon while the patient is actively flexing his bicep. If the physician cannot hook at least 1 cm underneath the tendon, then the tendon is considered to be ruptured. This test may be misinterpreted if either the bicipital aponeurosis or brachialis tendon is palpated instead of the distal biceps brachii tendon or if there is a partial tear instead of a full tear. For this reason, the test is not sensitive enough to rule out rupture. One review quoted, "It is concluded that the hook test is moderately sensitive at detecting complete DBTR when carried out by skilled clinicians in specialist upper limb clinics. As a single test, it is not sensitive enough to exclude complete DBTR."

Ruland biceps squeeze test - The patient is asked to place his arm in about 60 to 80 degrees of flexion with support. The physician then squeezes the distal muscle belly and observes for supination of the forearm. Lack of supination is supporting evidence for tendon rupture.

=== Imaging ===
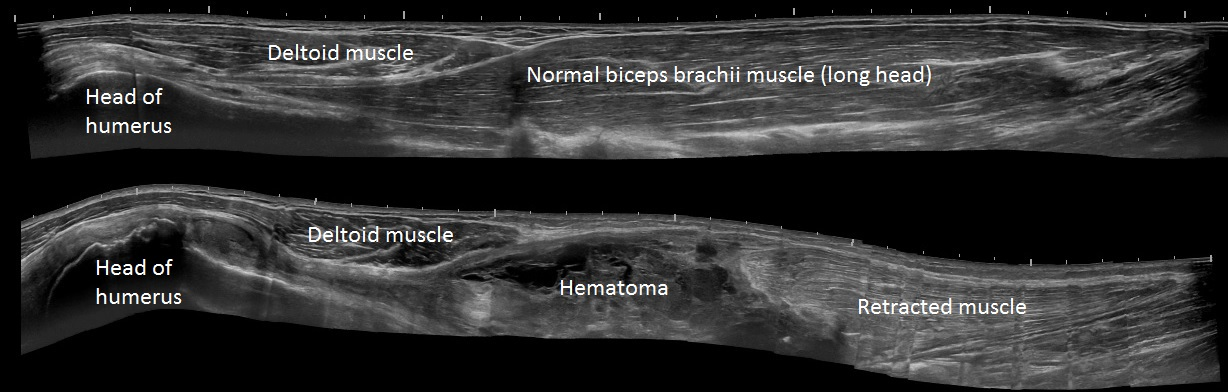
Panoramic ultrasonography of a proximal biceps tendon rupture (bottom image). Top image shows the contralateral normal side, and lower image shows a retracted muscle, with a hematoma filling out the proximal space.

X-ray will show nonspecific findings when diagnosing biceps tendon ruptures. Ultrasound is useful for diagnosing acute biceps tendon ruptures in the clinic. MRI, although costly, can be used to distinguish between complete and partial tears, between muscular and tendinous tears, and the degree of muscular retraction.

== Causes ==
Biceps tendon rupture may occur in patients with pre-existing rotator cuff tears or impingement syndromes, during athletic activities, or in the context of overuse, aging, or the use of corticosteroids.

=== Proximal tendon rupture ===
The most common tendon to be ruptured is the proximal tendon of the long head. Proximal tendon rupture is not assosiacted with a specific mechanism of injury, rather it more often seen in concurrence with rotator cuff tears or impingement syndromes.

=== Distal tendon rupture ===
The mechanism of injury for a distal tendon rupture is forced contraction under eccentric load. A few examples of forced contraction under eccentric load include mixed-grip deadlifts (one forearm pronated and the other supinated, putting the biceps under greater load), preacher curls, and the "kingsmove" technique in armwrestling. Distal tendon ruptures are more common in males than females. Distal tendon tuptures occur more frequently in the dominant arm.

== Treatment ==
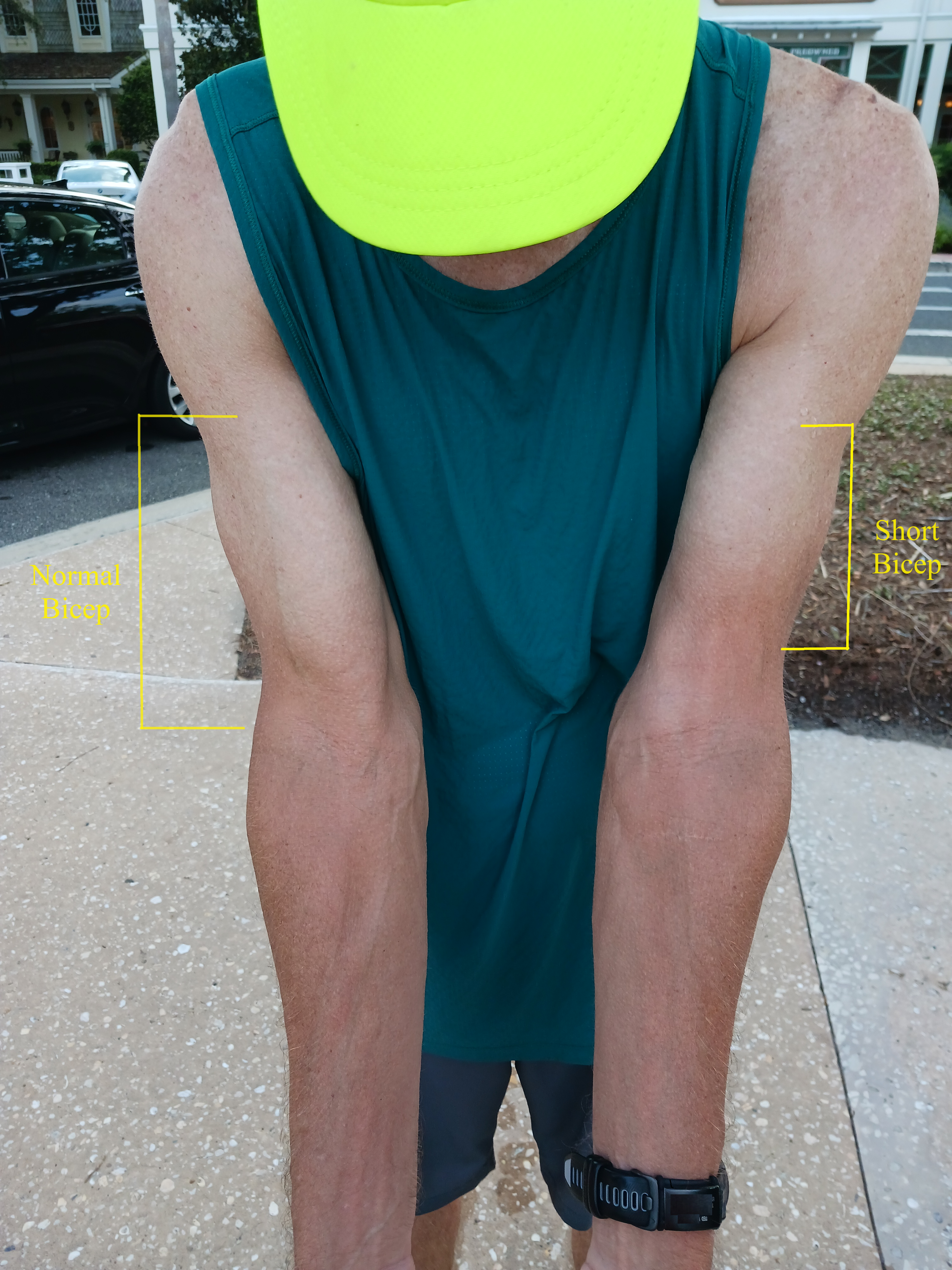
A proximal rupture is repaired by anchoring the tendon to a different location on the bone, like the humerus shaft. While this offers stability and improves function, it can also lead to a slightly shorter biceps muscle than the original anatomy.

Acute rupture of the distal biceps tendon can be treated nonoperatively with acceptable results, but because the injury can lead to 30% loss of elbow flexion strength and 30-50% loss of forearm supination strength, surgical repair is generally recommended. Complete distal biceps tears are commonly treated with re-attachment of the biceps tendon to its native insertion on the tuberosity of the radius using bone tunnels, suture buttons, or suture anchors. Proximal ruptures of the long head of the biceps tendon can be surgically addressed by two different techniques. Biceps tenodesis includes the release of the long head of the biceps tendon off of its insertion on the glenoid and re-attachment by screw or suture anchor fixation to the humerus. Biceps tenotomy consists of a simple release of the long head of the biceps without reattachment to the humerus, allowing the tendon to retract into the soft tissues of the proximal upper arm.

Treatment of a biceps tear depends on the severity of the injury. The muscle will usually heal over time with no corrective surgery. Applying cold pressure and using anti-inflammatory medications will ease pain and reduce swelling. More severe injuries require surgery and post-op physical therapy to regain strength and functionality in the muscle. Corrective surgeries of this nature are typically reserved for elite athletes who rely on a complete recovery. Older patients will be treated by long head bicep tenotomy almost without exception.

== Prognosis ==
Prognosis is dependent on the site of tendon rupture. Proximal tendon ruptures usually allow for a non-operative treatment course with minimal deficits in shoulder flexion, flexion at the elbow, and forearm supination. Distal tendon ruptures often require operative treatment, and can still cause persistent loss of function with regard to flexion at the elbow and forearm supination, especially for chronic cases with significant retraction of the tendon. As mentioned above, distal tendon ruptures are more common in athletes. Athletes who have sustained this injury return to athletics at a high rate regardless of the surgical technique or rehabilitation program. A few reviews have shown that return to activity is independent of surgical approach, athlete age, steroid use, and rehabilitation program. Other reviews have shown that surgical approach does affect time to return to sport. Nonoperative management of distal tendon ruptures results in inferior strength and endurance in flexion at the elbow and forearm supination.
