= Igor Troitski =

Scientist, inventor, professor, and author

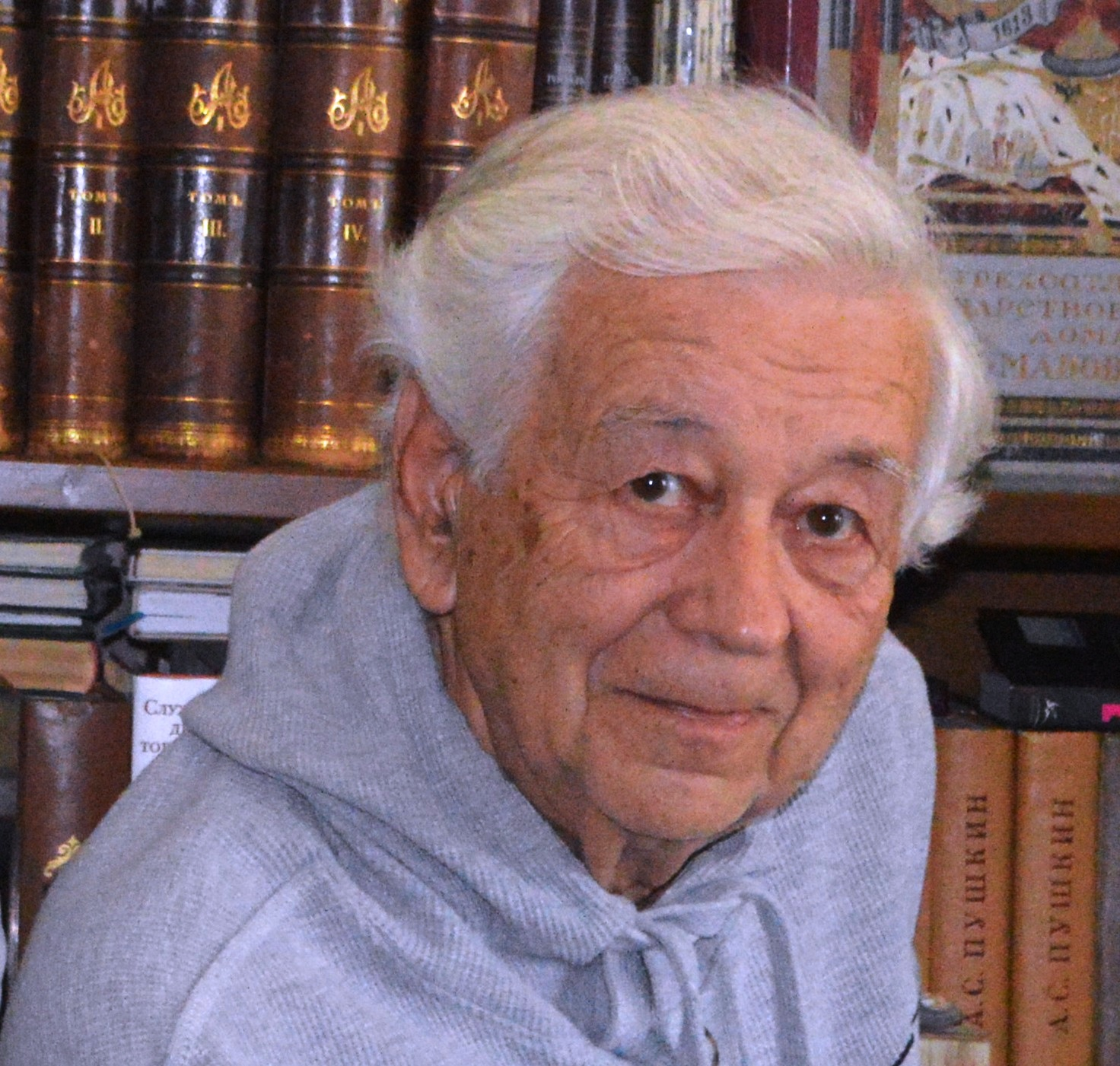
- Born: 2 May 1941 (age 85); Kaluga, Soviet Union
- Citizenship: Soviet, Russian, American
- Education: Moscow Institute of Physics and Technology
- Scientific career
- Fields: laser ranging, holography, tomography, information systems theory
- Workplaces: Moscow Institute of Physics and Technology; S. I. Vavilov Institute of History of Natural Science and Technology of the USSR Academy of Sciences
- Doctoral advisor: Vladislav Repin

Igor Nikolayevich Troitski (Russian: Игорь Николаевич Троицкий; born 2 May 1941) is a Soviet, Russian and American scientist, Doctor of technical sciences, professor and an author of more than 200 scientific papers, books, monographs and tutorials. His contributions are focused on the following topics: laser ranging, holography, tomography, adaptive optics and creation of optical images inside transparent material. Troitski has 79 Soviet inventor’s certificates and 29 US patents.

== Biography ==
Igor Troitski was born into a family of medical doctors. His mother – Bronislava Grigoryevna Lipnitskaya (1914–1996) – was a gynecologist. His father – Nikolai Alekseyevich Troitski (1896–1965) – was a professor in hospital therapy, who came into the field of medicine after graduating from theological seminary.

Troitski spent The Great Patriotic War years (1941–1945) in evacuation in Northern Kazakhstan with his mother and grandmother. From 1945 to 1952, he lived in the village Saltykovka near Moscow, and then moved to Moscow with his family. In 1958, he graduated from high school № 453 with a Gold Medal.

In 1958–1959, Troitski worked as a carpenter in Moscow ancillary production. In 1965, after graduating from the Moscow Institute of Physics and Technology, he received the qualification of an engineer-physicist and entered postgraduate studies. His scientific supervisor was the founder of the Soviet and Russian strategic missile and space defense system, Dr. Vladislav Repin.

From 1965 to 1971, Troitski worked at the United Design Bureau (UDB) under the code name UDB "Vympel". In 1969, he received a Candidate of Sciences degree (a Soviet equivalent of Doctor of Philosophy [PhD]) and in 1978, he defended his subsequent dissertation and became a Doctor of Technical Sciences. In 1971, Troitski moved to Research and Production Association under the code name RPA "Astrofizika", where he was the Head of theoretical laboratory working on the development of optimal systems for laser locators. At the same time, from 1971 to 1988, he taught at the department of laser ranging systems of the Moscow Institute of Physics and Technology. During this period, Troitski partnered with others in the field to publish many textbooks, articles and books on the problems of statistical theory of holography, laser ranging and adaptive optics.

In 1981, Troitski headed the research department focused on the development of systems using powerful laser installations, and was responsible for organizing and conducting experimental work on the effect of powerful laser radiation on various objects.

From 1988 to 1992, Troitski worked at the S. I. Vavilov Institute of History of Natural Science and Technology of the USSR Academy of Sciences. In parallel, he lectured at the Bauman Moscow Higher Technical School. During this time, his research interests were focused on the creation of statistical theory of tomography.

In 1994, Troitski took an active part in organizing the "Optics from Russia in New York" exhibition. In 1995, he coordinated and headed the optical research laboratory in New Jersey, where scientists and engineers from several Moscow institutes were invited under the SABIT program. The laboratory engaged in research on the creation of optical images based on the breakdown effect in various transparent materials and on the development of new holographic systems.

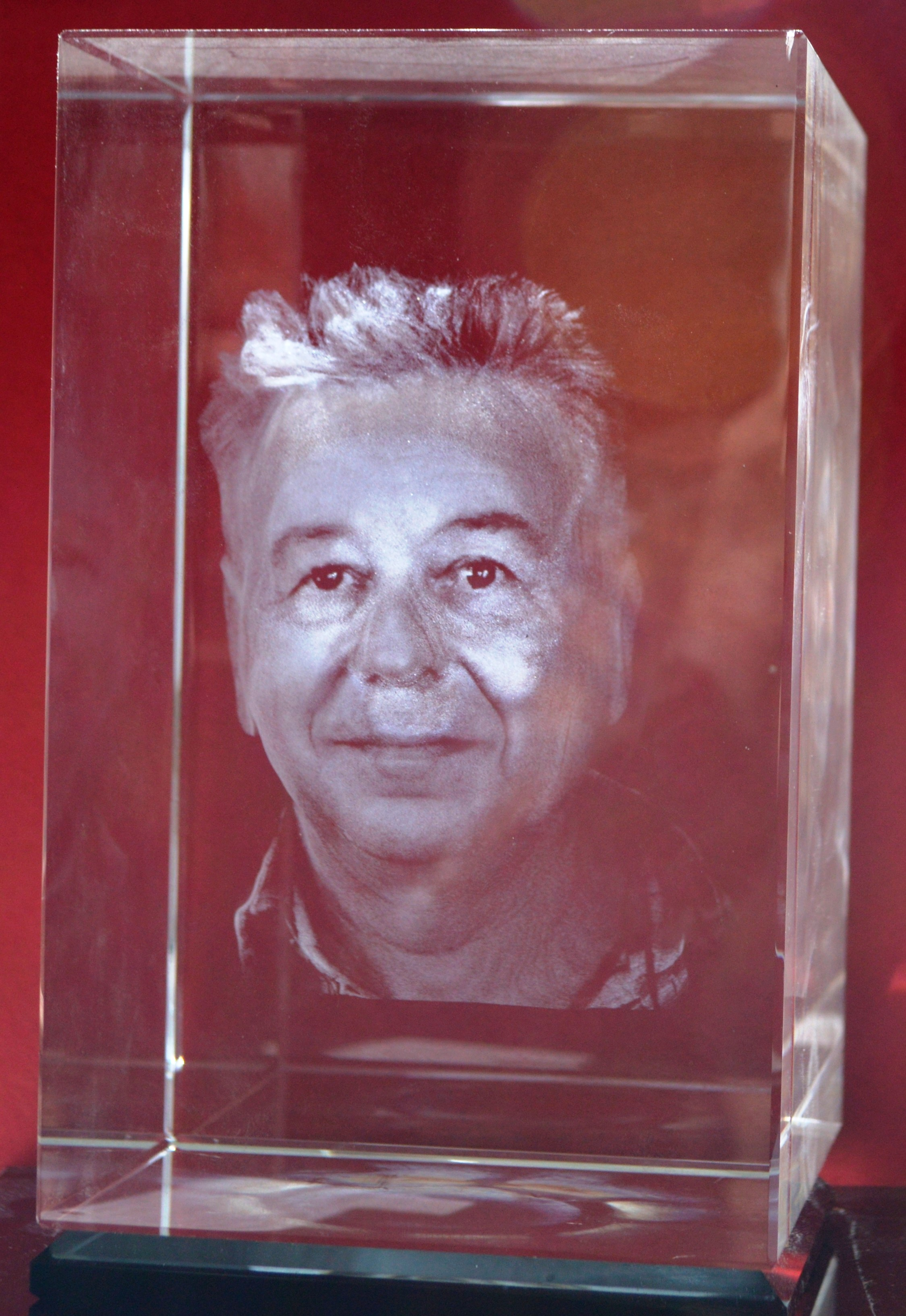
Self-portrait in a glass cube, created using the laser breakdown effect, 2003

In 1995, Troitski, along with two Russian scientists and American partners, organized a joint company Laser-Tech Design for production of optical images by using lasers in various transparent materials. The company was based in Las Vegas, Nevada.

In 1997, he formed a company, Igor Troitski, LLC.

From 1998 to 2001, he was a co-owner of Crystal Magic, based in Orlando, Florida. The company produced laser images of Disney characters.

In 2001, Troitski became a US citizen while retaining his Russian citizenship.

In 2012, he concluded his research and production activities and focused on literary work. He wrote and published two autobiography books on his life in the USSR and the USA.

=== Family ===
Igor Troitski was married two times. He shares a daughter Maria (born 1971) with his first wife – Tatiana Gorshkova. He shares a daughter Anna (born 1985) and grandson Yulian (born 2013) with his second wife – Olga Kharitonova.

He currently lives in Las Vegas, Nevada, USA.

== Bibliography ==
=== Scientific works ===
- I. N. Troitski, N. D. Ustinov. "Statistical Theory of Holography", Moscow, Publishing house "Radio i svyaz", 1981, 327 p.
- I. N. Matveyev, A. N. Safronov, I. N. Troitski, N. D. Ustinov. "Adaptation in Information Optical Systems", Moscow, Publishing house "Radio i svyaz", 1984, 343 p.
- I. N. Matveyev, V. V. Protopopov, I. N. Troitski, N. D. Ustinov. "Laser Ranging", Moscow, Publishing house "Mashinostroyeniye", 1984, 272 p.
- I. N. Troitski. "Statistical Theory of Tomography", Moscow, Publishing house "Radio i svyaz", 1989, 239 p.
- I. N. Troitski. "Coherent Optics and Holography", Tutorial, Moscow, MIPT, 1982. 95 p.
- I. N. Troitski. "Computed Tomography", Moscow, "Znaniye", 1988. 64 p.
- I. N. Troitski. A. N. Safronov, "Adaptive Optics", Moscow, "Znaniye", 1989. 64 p.
- I. N. Troitski. "Optimal Information Processing (Formation and Development of Principles)", Moscow, "Znaniye", 1990. 63 p.

=== Publications ===
- Igor Troitski. "Optics from Russia", Optical Engineering Bulletin, No 2, 1994.
- Igor Troitski. "Optical Research Laboratory", Optical Engineering Bulletin, No 3, 1995.
- Igor Troitski. "Laser-Induced Damage Creates Interior Images", OE REPORTS (International Optical Engineering Community), Number 191, November 1999.
- Igor N. Troitski. "Laser-Induced Damage in Optical Materials", Proceedings of the SPIE, Volume 3902, 1999.
- Igor N. Troitski. "Methods for Creation of Laser-Induced 3D Portraits Inside Transparent Materials", Proceedings of the SPIE, Volume 5203, November 2003.

=== Literary works ===
- Igor Troitski. Russian Among Jews, Jew Among Russians. Accent Graphics Communications, Ottawa, 2019, 164 pp.
- Igor Troitski. Two Lives. Notes of the Old Physicist. – Moscow: Publishing house of the Russian Union of Writers, 2021, 397 pp.
