= Discrete tomography =

Reconstruction of binary images from a small number of their projections

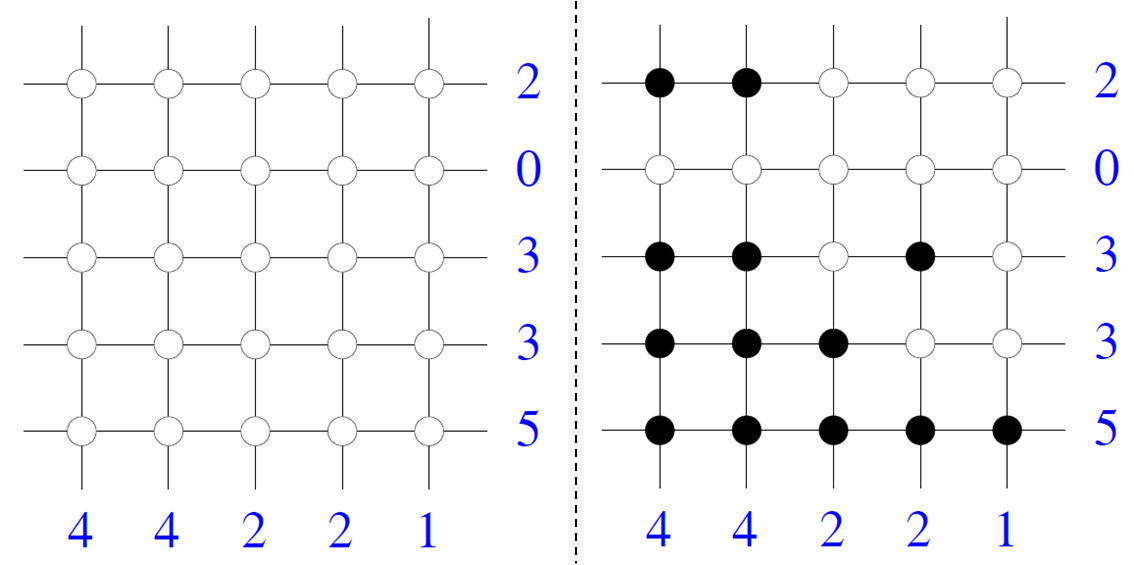
A discrete tomography reconstruction problem for two vertical and horizontal directions (left), together with its (non-unique) solution (right). The task is to color some of the white points black so that the number of black points in the rows and columns match the blue numbers.

Discrete tomography focuses on the problem of reconstruction of binary images (or finite subsets of the integer lattice) from a small number of their projections.

In general, tomography deals with the problem of determining shape and dimensional information of an object from a set of projections. From the mathematical point of view, the object corresponds to a function and the problem posed is to reconstruct this function from its integrals or sums over subsets of its domain. In general, the tomographic inversion problem may be continuous or discrete. In continuous tomography both the domain and the range of the function are continuous and line integrals are used. In discrete tomography the domain of the function may be either discrete or continuous, and the range of the function is a finite set of real, usually nonnegative numbers. In continuous tomography when a large number of projections is available, accurate reconstructions can be made by many different algorithms. It is typical for discrete tomography that only a few projections (line sums) are used. In this case, conventional techniques all fail. A special case of discrete tomography deals with the problem of the reconstruction of a binary image from a small number of projections. The name discrete tomography is due to Larry Shepp, who organized the first meeting devoted to this topic (DIMACS Mini-Symposium on Discrete Tomography, September 19, 1994, Rutgers University).

== Theory ==
Discrete tomography has strong connections with other mathematical fields, such as number theory, discrete mathematics, computational complexity theory and combinatorics. In fact, a number of discrete tomography problems were first discussed as combinatorial problems. In 1957, H. J. Ryser found a necessary and sufficient condition for a pair of vectors being the two orthogonal projections of a discrete set. In the proof of his theorem, Ryser also described a reconstruction algorithm, the very first reconstruction algorithm for a general discrete set from two orthogonal projections. In the same year, David Gale found the same consistency conditions, but in connection with the network flow problem. Another result of Ryser's is the definition of the switching operation by which discrete sets having the same projections can be transformed into each other.

The problem of reconstructing a binary image from a small number of projections generally leads to a large number of solutions. It is desirable to limit the class of possible solutions to only those that are typical of the class of the images which contains the image being reconstructed by using a priori information, such as convexity or connectedness.

=== Theorems ===
- Reconstructing (finite) planar lattice sets from their 1-dimensional X-rays is an NP-hard problem if the X-rays are taken from $m\geq 3$ lattice directions (for $m=2$ the problem is in P).
- The reconstruction problem is highly unstable for $m\geq 3$ (meaning that a small perturbation of the X-rays may lead to completely different reconstructions) and stable for $m=2$, see.
- Coloring a grid using $k$ colors with the restriction that each row and each column has a specific number of cells of each color is known as the $(k-1)$−atom problem in the discrete tomography community. The problem is NP-hard for $k \geq 3$, see.

For further results, see

== Algorithms ==
Among the reconstruction methods one can find algebraic reconstruction techniques (e.g., DART or), greedy algorithms (see for approximation guarantees), and Monte Carlo algorithms.

== Applications ==
Various algorithms have been applied in image processing, medicine, three-dimensional statistical data security problems, computer tomograph assisted engineering and design, electron microscopy and materials science, including the 3DXRD microscope.

A form of discrete tomography also forms the basis of nonograms, a type of logic puzzle in which information about the rows and columns of a digital image is used to reconstruct the image.

== See also ==
- Geometric tomography
