= Ultrasound transmission tomography =

- [edit on Wikidata]

Ultrasound transmission tomography (UTT) is a form of tomography involving ultrasound.

Like X-ray tomography, the attenuation of the ultrasound as it passes through the object can be measured, but since the speed of sound is so much lower than the speed of light, the delay as it passes through the object can also be measured, allowing estimation of both the attenuation coefficient and the index of refraction. Traditional ultrasound imaging primarily detects boundaries between different media. Also unlike X-rays, the paths through the object are not necessarily straight lines, as they are deflected at each boundary. Tumors typically have a higher speed of sound than surrounding tissue.

== See also ==
- Ultrasound computer tomography
