= Tendon rupture =

Type of injury

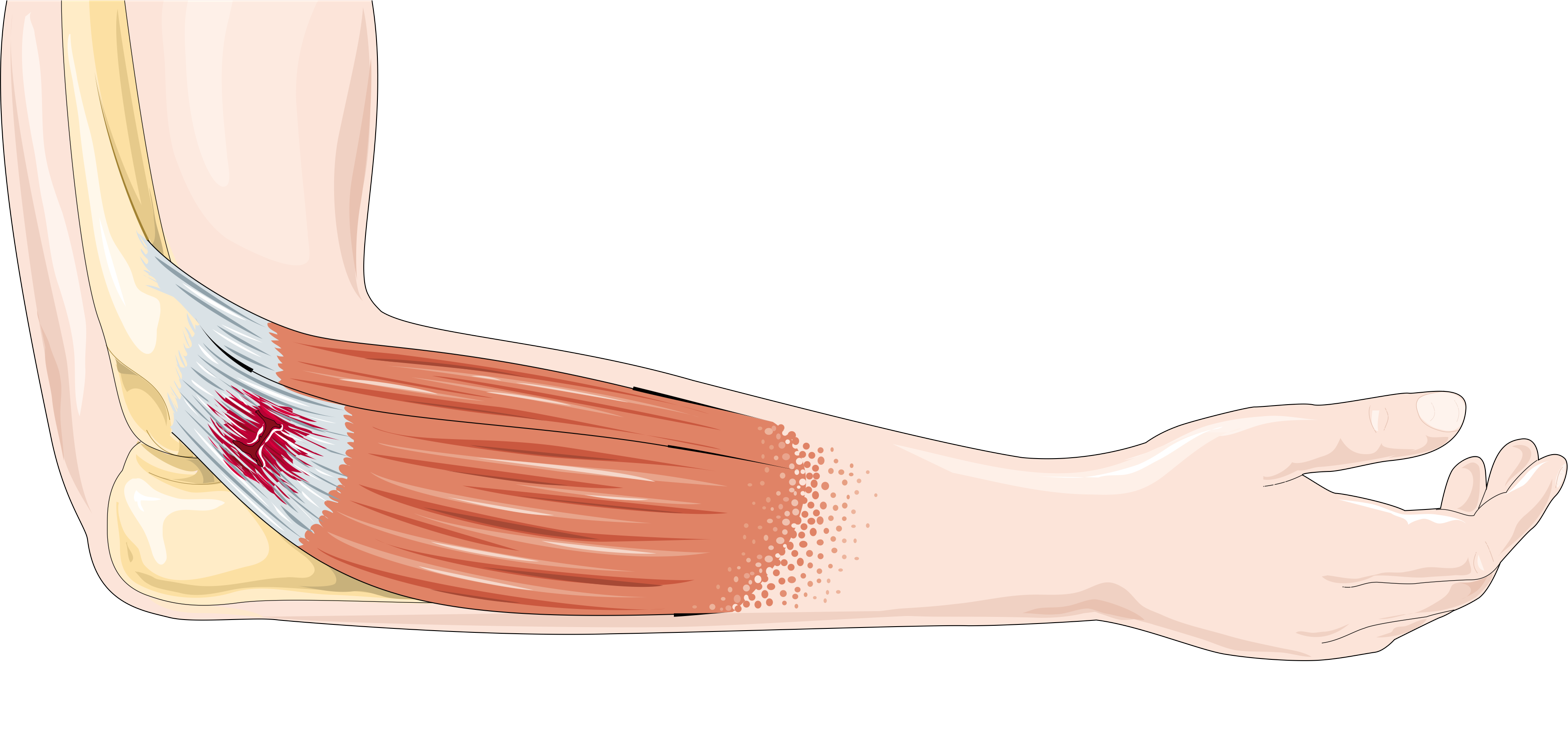
- Tendon rupture
- Specialty: Orthopedics
- Symptoms: Sudden pain, swelling, bruising, weakness, inability to move the affected joint
- Complications: Chronic weakness, re-rupture, joint instability
- Usual onset: Sudden
- Causes: Trauma, overuse, degenerative changes, corticosteroid use
- Diagnostic method: Physical examination, ultrasound, MRI
- Treatment: Rest, ice, compression, elevation (R.I.C.E.), physical therapy, surgery
- Prognosis: Varies; depends on severity and treatment
- Frequency: Common

Tendon rupture is a condition in which a tendon separates in whole or in part from tissue to which it is attached, or is itself torn or otherwise divided in whole or in part.

Examples include:

- Achilles tendon rupture
- Biceps tendon rupture
- Anterior cruciate ligament injury
- Biceps femoris tendon rupture and Quadriceps tendon rupture
- Cruciate ligament § Rupture
- Patellar tendon rupture
