= Network tomography =

Network tomography is the study of a network's internal characteristics using information derived from end point data. The word tomography is used to link the field, in concept, to other processes that infer the internal characteristics of an object from external observation, as is done in MRI or PET scanning (even though the term tomography strictly refers to imaging by slicing). The field is a recent development in electrical engineering and computer science, dating from 1996. Network tomography seeks to map the path data takes through the Internet by examining information from “edge nodes,” the computers in which the data are originated and from which they are requested.

The field is useful for engineers attempting to develop more efficient computer networks. Data derived from network tomography studies can be used to increase quality of service by limiting link packet loss and increasing routing optimization.

== Recent developments ==
There have been many published papers and tools in the area of network tomography, which aim to monitor the health of various links in a network in real-time. These can be classified into loss and delay tomography.

=== Loss tomography ===
Loss tomography aims to find “lossy” links in a network by sending active “probes” from various vantage points in the network or the Internet.

=== Delay tomography ===
The area of delay tomography has also attracted attention in the recent past. It aims to find link delays using end-to-end probes sent from vantage points. This can potentially help isolate links with large queueing delays caused by congestion.

== More applications ==
Network tomography may be able to infer network topology using end-to-end probes. Topology discovery is a tradeoff between accuracy vs. overhead. With network tomography, the emphasis is to achieve as accurate a picture of the network with minimal overhead. In comparison, other network topology discovery techniques using SNMP or route analytics aim for greater accuracy with less emphasis on overhead reduction.

Network tomography may find links which are shared by multiple paths (and can thus become potential bottlenecks in the future).

Network Tomography may improve the control of a smart grid

== See also ==
- Network science
- Computer network
