= Geometric tomography =

Geometric tomography is a mathematical field that focuses on problems of reconstructing homogeneous (often convex) objects from tomographic data (this might be X-rays, projections, sections, brightness functions, or covariograms). More precisely, according to R.J. Gardner (who introduced the term), "Geometric tomography deals with the retrieval of information about a geometric object from data concerning its projections (shadows) on planes or cross-sections by planes."

== Theory ==
A key theorem in this area states that any convex body in $E^n$ can be determined by parallel, coplanar X-rays in a set of four directions whose slopes have a transcendental cross ratio.

== Examples ==
- Radon transform
- Funk transform (a.k.a. spherical Radon transform)

== See also ==
- Tomography
- Tomographic reconstruction
- Discrete tomography
- Generalized conic
