= Multiscale tomography =

Multiscale tomography (or multi-length scale tomography) is a form of tomography spanning large orders of magnitude in resolution, often utilizing many different forms of tomography together to do so. The forms of tomography combined in the process depend on what is being studied and the details needed. Each form of tomography has an optimal range of optical resolution that it can function across, but many modern materials and applications need information beyond the range of a single form of tomography. Combining this information using many forms of tomography can help provide a holistic view of the system being looked at, and is important for computer simulations.
