= Neutron stimulated emission computed tomography =

Imaging technique using induced gamma rays

- Purpose: detecting liver iron overload disorders

Neutron stimulated emission computed tomography (NSECT) uses induced gamma emission through neutron inelastic scattering to generate images of the spatial distribution of elements in a sample.

== Clinical Applications ==
NSECT has been shown to be effective in detecting liver iron overload disorders and breast cancer. Due to its sensitivity in measuring elemental concentrations, NSECT is currently being developed for cancer staging, among other medical applications.

== NSECT mechanism ==
A given atomic nucleus, defined by its proton and neutron numbers, is a quantized system with a set of characteristic higher energy levels that it can occupy as a nuclear isomer. When the nucleus in its ground state is struck by a fast neutron with kinetic energy greater than that of its first excited state, it can undergo an isomeric transition to one of its excited states by receiving the necessary energy from the fast neutron through inelastic scatter. Promptly (on the order of picoseconds, on average) after excitation, the excited nuclear isomer de-excites (either directly or through a series of cascades) to the ground state, emitting a characteristic gamma ray for each decay transition with energy equal to the difference in the energy levels involved (see induced gamma emission). After irradiating the sample with neutrons, the measured number of emitted gamma rays of energy characteristic to the nucleus of interest is directly proportional to the number of such nuclei along the incident neutron beam trajectory. After repeating the measurement for neutron beam incidence at positions around the sample, an image of the distribution of the nuclei in the sample can be reconstructed as done in tomography.
