= Ultrasound computer tomography =

Imaging technique using inaudible air blasts

- Purpose: use for soft tissue medical imaging

Ultrasound computer tomography (USCT), sometimes also Ultrasound computed tomography, Ultrasound computerized tomography or just Ultrasound tomography, is a form of medical ultrasound tomography utilizing ultrasound waves as physical phenomenon for imaging. It is mostly in use for soft tissue medical imaging, especially breast imaging.

== Description ==
Measurement procedure of a 3D USCT: semi-spherical water filled measurement container lined with ultrasound transducer arrays in cylindrical housings (transducer elements as green dots). Centrally placed a simple object (red). Spherical wave emitted (semi-transparent blue), all other transducers gather data. Wave-front interacts with object and re-emits a secondary wave (semi-transparent purple). Repeated iteratively for all transducers.

Ultrasound computer tomographs use ultrasound waves to create images. In the first measurement step, a defined ultrasound wave is generated with typically Piezoelectric ultrasound transducers, transmitted in direction of the measurement object and received with other or the same ultrasound transducers. While traversing and interacting with the object the ultrasound wave is changed by the object and carries now information about the object. After being recorded the information from the modulated waves can be extracted and used to create an image of the object in a second step. Unlike X-ray or other physical properties which provide typically only one information, ultrasound provides multiple information of the object for imaging: the attenuation the wave's sound pressure experiences indicate on the object's attenuation coefficient, the time-of-flight of the wave gives speed of sound information, and the scattered wave indicates on the echogenicity of the object (e.g. refraction index, surface morphology, etc.). Unlike conventional ultrasound sonography, which uses phased array technology for beamforming, most USCT systems utilize unfocused spherical waves for imaging. Most USCT systems aiming for 3D-imaging, either by synthesizing ("stacking") 2D images or by full 3D aperture setups. Another aim is quantitative imaging instead of only qualitative imaging.

The idea of Ultrasound computer tomography goes back to the 1950s with analogue compounding setups, in the mid-1970s the first "computed" USCT systems were built up, utilizing digital technology. The "computer" in the USCT concept indicates the heavy reliance on computational intensive advanced digital signal processing, image reconstruction and image processing algorithms for imaging. Successfully realization of USCT systems in the last decades was possible through the continuously growing availability of computing power and data bandwidth provided by the digital revolution.

== Setup ==
USCT systems designed for medical imaging of soft tissue typically aim for resolution in the order of centimeters to millimeters and require therefore ultrasound waves in the order of mega-hertz frequency. This requires typically water as low-attenuating transmission medium between ultrasound transducers and object to retain suitable sound pressures.

USCT systems share with the common tomography the fundamental architectural similarity that the aperture, the active imaging elements, surround the object. For the distribution of ultrasound transducers around the measurement object, forming the aperture, multiple design approaches exist. There exist mono-, bi- and multistatic setups of transducer configurations. Common are 1D- or 2D- linear arrays of ultrasound transducers acting as emitters on one side of the object, on the opposing side of the object a similar array acting as receiver is placed, forming a parallel setup. Sometimes accompanied by the additional ability to be moved to gather more information from additional angles. While cost-efficient to build the main disadvantage of such a setup is the limited ability (or inability) of gathering reflectivity information, as such an aperture is limited to only transmission information. Another aperture approach is a ring of transducers, sometimes with the degree of freedom of motorized lifting for gathering additional information over the height for 3D imaging ("stacking"). Full 3D setups, with no inherent need for aperture movements, exist in the form of apertures formed by semi-spherical distributed transducers. While the most expensive setup they offer the advantage of nearly-uniform data, gathered from many directions. Also, they are fast in data taking as they don't require time-costly mechanical movements.

== Imaging methods and algorithms ==
Tomographic reconstruction methods used in USCT systems for transmission information based imaging are classical inverse radon transform and fourier slice theorem and derived algorithms (cone beam etc.). As advanced alternatives, ART-based approaches are also utilized. For high-resolution and speckle noise reduced reflectivity imaging Synthetic Aperture Focusing Techniques (SAFT), similar to radar's SAR and sonar's SAS, are widely used. Iterative wave equation inversion approaches as imaging method coming from the seismology are under academic research, but usage for real world applications is due to the enormous computational and memory burden still a challenge.

== Application and usage ==
Many USCT systems are designed for soft tissue imaging and for breast cancer diagnosis specifically. As an ultrasound-based method with low sound pressures, USCT is a harmless and risk-free imaging method, suitable for periodical screening. As USCT setups are fixed or motor moved without direct contact with the breast the reproduction of images is easier as with common, manually guided methods (e.g. Breast ultrasound) which rely on the individual examiners' performance and experience. In comparison with conventional screening methods like mammography, USCT systems offer potentially an increased specificity for breast cancer detection, as multiple breast cancer characteristic properties are imaged at the same time: speed-of-sound, attenuation and morphology.

== See also ==
- Medical ultrasound
- Tomography
- Ultrasound transmission tomography
- Ultrasound-modulated optical tomography
