= Ultrasound-modulated optical tomography =

- Purpose: imaging of soft tissue

Ultrasound-modulated optical tomography (UOT), also known as Acousto-Optic Tomography (AOT), is a hybrid imaging modality that combines light and sound; it is a form of tomography involving ultrasound. It is used in imaging of biological soft tissues and has potential applications for early cancer detection. As a hybrid modality which uses both light and sound, UOT provides some of the best features of both: the use of light provides strong contrast and sensitivity (both molecular and functional); these two features are derived from the optical component of UOT. The use of ultrasound allows for high resolution, as well as a high imaging depth. However, the difficulty of tackling the two fundamental problems with UOT (low SNR in deep tissue and short speckle decorrelation time) have caused UOT to evolve relatively slowly; most work in the field is limited to theoretical simulations or phantom / sample studies.

== Basic Description of Acousto-Optic Tomography ==
In UOT, ultrasound transducers are used to apply ultrasounds wave into a medium, usually some biological tissue. Applying these ultrasound waves, or an ultrasound field, to a region of tissue will change the optical properties of the tissue in time and space. This region of ultrasound-modulated tissue is the region of interest (ROI) which will be analyzed. Photons are then sent into the tissue from some source, such as a laser. Eventually, despite the strength of optical scattering in tissue, some of these photons will pass through the ROI. The photons that pass through the ROI will change according to the modulation of the tissue; this causes the photons to be "tagged". Typically, this tagging will cause the frequency of the light to shift by the frequency of the US field.

Sufficiently coherent light traveling through a medium creates a speckle pattern (Fig 1 of next citation). Modulating the ultrasound field applied to the ROI will cause the speckle patterns to change, due to the 3 modulation mechanisms which are explained below. The changes of these speckle patterns are used to derive various properties of the tissue during reconstruction and analysis. Optical properties that can be derived include the optical absorption coefficient, the optical scattering coefficient, and the fluence in the region of interest; UOT can also be used to derive mechanical properties as well.

== Use of Light and Sound in Conjunction ==
Optical imaging modalities typically rely on ballistic photons to collect and convey information. However, as a result of strong optical scattering in tissue, conventional imaging modalities struggle to image deeper into tissue, past the optical diffusion limit (typically about 1 mm into tissue). Various imaging modalities have been developed to peer deeper into tissue, such as diffuse optical tomography (DOT) and optical coherence tomography (OCT). While OCT has fantastic spatial resolution (3.5 and 7 micrometer resolutions, axially and lateral respectively), its imaging depth is limited to the millimeter range (e.g. 2.5 mm). DOT has fantastic penetration, on the scale of centimeters, but suffers from inferior resolution (~1cm).

To address the difficulty of deep optical imaging, hybrid ultrasound and optical imaging modalities have been developed, namely UOT and photoacoustic imaging (PAI). Both imaging modalities use diffuse photons, which typically cannot be used to transmit information from deep within the tissue. This is because strong optical scattering means that it is incredibly difficult to determine where the photons have traveled and how many scattering events they might have gone through. UOT and PAI have different ways to effectively transfer information from the diffuse photons within the tissue back to the system, which allows for centimeter imaging depths (deeper than DOT) while retaining high spatial resolutions (millimeters to 100s of micrometers).

Photoacoustic imaging sends a pulse of light into tissue; as photons are absorbed by the tissue, the resulting heating rise results in thermoelastic expansion. This leads to a pressure wave propagation, which is collected by ultrasound transducers. Thus, PAI uses photons to acquire information deep inside tissue and uses ultrasound to transmit that information to the system. In contrast, UOT relies on photons for information transmission and uses ultrasound to acquire information. Ultrasound is used in UOT to "tag" or identify photons which have passed through the region of interest; these photons can be trusted to carry information back to the system regarding the region of interest. The modulation of the ultrasound will accordingly change the optical properties of the tissue, which can be used to derive both optical and mechanical properties.

The difference in the use of ultrasound between PAI and UOT means that different types of information can be derived from the two different modalities. PAI is proficient in delivering information regarding optical absorption; UOT can provide information regarding both optical absorption and optical scattering. Thus, UOT has a strong advantage over PAI in that UOT can provide information about tissue/organ structure as well as tissue metabolism.

== Advantages ==
UOT utilizes all photons within deep tissue; as long as they have not been absorbed and they pass through the ROI, those photons can still be used to convey information in UOT. Thus, UOT can achieve imaging depths (exploiting diffuse photons) deeper than 9 cm into the body while retaining high spatial resolutions (from the dimensions of the ultrasound focus), ~mm scale, as of 2017. UOT can be used to derive mechanical and optical properties of the tissue; compared to PAI, which can only derive optical absorption, UOT can derive absorption and scattering properties of the tissue.

== Disadvantages ==
There are two fundamental problems with UOT:

- UOT has very low signal to noise in deep tissue; with an imaging depth of several centimeters, the ratio between untagged and tagged photons can be greater than 100:1 and even 1000:1. As the tagged photons are the photons which carry the information, this leads to difficulties in recovering data as a result of strong background noise (untagged photons).
  - This is due to deep tissue having a large diffuse volume, which leads to a very low ultrasound focus.
  - Because of this incredibly weak signal to noise ratio, compensatory methods are required for any practical UOT system.
    - One way to tackle this problem is by effective filtering techniques, which allow for a large decrease in the background noise of untagged protons.
    - The other problem is to improve the sensitivity of the UOT system to tagged photons.
- UOT data comes from speckles resulting from scattering of photons through tissue. As biological tissue is constantly in motion on a microscopic scale, UOT imaging in-vivo results in a very short speckle decorrelation time of less than 1 millisecond in biological tissue.
  - Thus, UOT systems typically require high temporal resolution in order to be able to derive data from stable speckle patterns.

== Basic Concepts ==
UOT is built upon the modulation of light due to the effects of ultrasonic waves on the optical properties of the testing medium. The target within the testing medium will be irradiated by a laser beam and a focused ultrasonic wave. The reemitted light propagating through the ultrasonic field or ultrasonic focal zone will then carry information of local optical and acoustic properties of this zone. These properties will be used to reconstruct images showing the inside view of the medium.

=== Mechanisms ===
There are three important mechanisms behind UOT technology.

1 Incoherent Modulation of Light Due to Ultrasound-Induced Variations in Optical Properties of Medium. As the ultrasonic wave propagates through the medium, the mass density of the medium will be changed due to the vibration. This variation in mass density will then influence the local optical properties. For example, the local absorption coefficient, scattering coefficient, and the index of refraction will all be modulated. With different optical properties, the reemitted light features (like intensity) will be modified.

2 Variations in Optical Phase in Response to Ultrasound-Induced Displacements of Scatterers. This mechanism mainly describes the effect in a microcosmic view. With the vibration from focused ultrasound, the local scatterers within the medium will be moved. When coherent light passes through such region, the displacement of scatterers will then cause optical phases change and then further modulate the light's free-path lengths. In the end, the reemitted light will form speckle pattern.

3 Variations in Optical Phase in Response to Ultrasonic Modulation of Index of Refraction of Background Medium. Similar to the second mechanism, the mass density modulation caused by ultrasonic wave vibration will also modulate the medium's index of refraction. This effect can further influence the free-path phases when light passes through the ultrasonic region and form a speckle pattern.

In conclusion, these three mechanisms describe how the modulation of the ultrasonic wave can modulate and fluctuate the light intensity (in mechanism 1), the light phase and form speckle pattern (mechanism 2 and 3). Mechanisms 2 and 3 require a coherent light source; mechanism 1 does not. When coherent light sources are applied, mechanism 1 can be disregarded, as its effect compared to mechanisms 2 and 3 are effectively negligible. These three mechanisms are the fundamental building blocks required to design a UOT system.

== UOT analytic model ==
In analytic model, two approximations are made. (1) the optical wavelength is much shorter than the mean free path (weak-scattering approximation) and (2) the ultrasound-induced change in the optical path length is much less than the optical wavelength (weak-modulation approximation).

With the first approximation, we can assume the ensemble-averaged correlations between electric fields are the same. Since the differences between correlation results from different paths are negligible. With this assumption, the correlations for electric fields G1(ꚍ) can be written as the following:

$G1(\tau)=\int p(s)\langle E_s(t)E_s^*(t+\tau)\rangle ds$

In this equation the parenthesis represents the ensemble and time averaging. Es demsontrates the unit-amplitude electric field of the scattered light of a path of length s, and p(s) denotes the probability density function of s. In analytic UOT model, we treat the light source as an optical plane wave. We assume the plane wave light normally hit a slab of thickness d. The transmitted light will be captured by a point detector. After applying diffusion theory, the original G1 equation can be further modified as:

$G1(\tau)=\left ( \frac{\left ( \frac{d}{l_t'} \right )(\sinh({\varepsilon[1-cos(\omega_a\tau)]})^{1/2})}{\sinh(d/l_t')({\varepsilon[1-cos(\omega_a\tau)]})^{1/2}} \right )$

Where $\varepsilon=6(\delta_n+\delta_d)(n_0k_0A)^{1/2}$ $\delta_n=(\alpha_{n1}+\alpha_{n2})\eta^2$ $\alpha_{n1}=1/2k_al_t'\arctan(k_al_t')$ $\alpha_{n2}=\frac{\alpha_{n1}}{k_al_t'/\arctan(k_al_t')-1}$ $\delta_d=\frac{1}{6}$

In these equations, ωa represents the acoustic angular frequency, and the n0 is the background index of refraction; k0 is the magnitude of the optical wave vector in vacuo; A is the acoustic amplitude, which is proportional to the acoustic pressure; ka is the magnitude of the acoustic wavevector; l_{t}' is the optical transport mean free path; η is the elasto-optical coefficient; ρ is the mass density; $\delta_n \delta_d$ represents how ultrasound averagely change the light per free path via index of refraction and displacementare respectively.

After deriving the autocorrelation equation, Wiener-Khinchin theorem is applied. With this theorem, we can further connect G1 with the spectral density of the modulated speckle. Their relationship in frequency space is shown as the following Fourier transformation equation.

$S(\omega)=\int_{-{\infty }}^{\infty} G1(\tau)\exp(i \omega \tau)d\tau$

For simplicity, the Fourier transformed term exp(-iω_{0}t) is dropped, and the ω here represents relative angular frequency of unmodulated light. For example, if ω=0 this equation is calculating the spectral density with absolute angular frequency ω_{0}. Since G1 is an even autocorrelation function, the spectral intensity at ω_{a} can be written as:

$I_n=\frac{1}{T_a}\int\limits_{0}^{T_a} \cos(n \omega_a \tau)G1(\tau)d\tau$

Here, the n and Ta represent the acoustic period. Since the frequency spectrum is symmetric about ω_{0}, the one side modulation depth is defined as:

$M_1=\frac{I_1}{I_0}$

Then we can consider the condition under the second approximation (weak-modulation approximation). In this situation, the term $(d/l_t')\varepsilon ^{1/2}$ is much smaller than 1. By applying the feature of sinh function, which is the main component of G1 function, the original autocorrelation G1 can be further simplified as:

$G1(\tau)=1-\frac{1}{6}(\frac{d}{l_t'})^2\varepsilon[1-cos(\omega_a \tau)]$

Therefore, the one side modulation depth can be simplified as $M_1=\frac{1}{12}({\frac{d}{l_t'}})^2\varepsilon$. From previous equation, we can see $\varepsilon=6(\delta_n+\delta_d)(n_0k_0A)^{1/2}$. Therefore, in conclusion, A and M1 has quadratic relationship. Such quadratic modulation can be captured by a Fabry-Perot interferometer. Or, we can calculate the ratio between observed AC signal and he observed DC signal (also named as apparent modulation depth) which can carry enough information to represent such modulation as well.

In conclusion, in UOT analytic model, with the help of weak-scattering approximation, weak-modulation approximation, diffusion theory, and Wiener-Khinchin theorem, the relationship between acoustic amplitude and modulated light can be successfully observed.

== Single Frequency UOT ==
Single frequency UOT leverages the frequency shift induced by the physical displacement of scatterers. This shifts the frequency of the incident light by the ultrasound frequency for photons that travel through the ultrasound focal region creating so called "tagged" photons. Measuring the intensity variation of these tagged photons gives information on the optical properties of the ultrasound focal region. As such, an image can be formed by tracking the intensity of tagged photons as the ultrasound scans the tissue.

The most restrictive challenge in practical application of single frequency UOT for imaging in tissues is the poor signal-to-noise ratio (SNR) and contrast-to-noise ratio (CNR). To address this, there has been work in integrating different detection mechanisms to attenuate the untagged photon signal to the point where the tagged photon signal is more easily measured. The filters are implemented in the measurement pipeline between the light collection location on the sample and the photodiode used to construct the image. Several filtering methods have been studied in an effort to determine the most promising approach. Additionally, other detection methods have been developed towards addressing this issue. The four most prevalent detection techniques that have been studied are speckle contrast imaging, photorefractive detection, off-axis holography, and spectral hole burning.

=== Detection Techniques ===
==== Speckle Contrast Imaging ====
Speckle contrast imaging is the most straightforward approach to detecting the as it requires no additional equipment or reference beams. The idea of this method is to simply take a long exposure image of the transmitted light, called the speckle field, with the time being much longer than the ultrasound period. Next, the contrast of the speckles, defined as the standard deviation divided by the average intensity, is calculated. This contrast value is correlated with the ratio of tagged to untagged photons contained in a given speckle. As the number of tagged photons increases, the measured contrast will decrease and indicate a difference between tissue regions.

The challenge in using this method is that it does not directly address the SNR issue present in UOT. That is, the fact that the tagged photon signal is much lower than the untagged photon signal means the changes in contrast will be correspondingly low across the tissue. Therefore, speckle contrast imaging struggles greatly to achieve good performance as compared to other methods that apply techniques to amplify the tagged signal or attenuate the untagged one.

==== Off-axis Holography ====
Off-axis holography uses interference between the speckle field and a reference beam to improve detection. In this setup, the speckle field and reference beam are superimposed onto a detector with the reference beam having an incident angle. The interference between these two beams is the recorded measurement. The beating effects of the untagged photons and reference beam interference that arise at the ultrasound frequency average out over a sufficiently long integration time. As a result, the integrated interference signal has no untagged photon intensity at the ultrasound frequency. The fast Fourier transform (FFT) of the integrated interference signal can be taken, and the amplitude present at the ultrasound frequency is only due to the tagged photons. Then the inverse FFT is taken to retrieve the speckle field containing only the tagged photon contributions.

The need to take the FFT and inverse FFT to obtain images drastically increases the computational load. Considering that higher resolution images would necessarily increase the dimensionality of the measurement, the computational requirements to obtain high frame rate data quickly becomes prohibitive.

==== Photorefractive Detection ====
Photorefractive detection uses materials that exhibit a photorefractive effect to process the transmitted light. The speckle field and a reference beam are superimposed at an angle within the material. The two beams interfere within the material generating an index grating. This leads to part of the reference field being diffracted, which then replicates the initial speckle field. Finally, the speckle field and diffracted reference replicating the speckle field can selectively interfere on a larger detector to obtain the UOT image. Then, by subtracting a baseline image without ultrasound modulation, the tagged photon intensity can be extracted.

The primary obstacle for the photorefractive method is the excessively long response time of the material (~ 100 ms). This is too long to be used for in vivo tissue imaging where the speckle decorrelation time is ~0.1-1 ms. As a result, while photorefractive detection has relatively good noise characteristics, the limitation in translating the technology to real tissue imaging has prevent focused development.

==== Spectral Hole Burning ====
Spectral hole burning utilizes materials doped with rare-earth ions that act as a spectral band-pass filter. The material exhibits heterogeneous broadening, which allows for the selective absorption spectrum to be manually altered. The material is cryogenically cooled and excited with a pump beam at the desired pass frequency. A certain amount of the doped ions absorb the photons from the pump beam and are excited from their ground state for a short time interval. During this time, the absorption spectrum is altered such that a spectral "hole" is burned around the pump beam frequency resulting in decreased absorption. The width of the spectral hole depends on the properties of the heterogeneous broadening of the material and the decrease in absorption is dependent on the pump beam intensity. Any light that passes through the material while the spectral hole is present will have a greatly attenuated signal at frequencies other than the pump frequency. Therefore, by using a pump frequency that closely matches the expected frequency of the tagged photon signal, the noise from the untagged photons can be effectively attenuated.

Compared to the other detection methods, spectral hole burning possesses the best CNR performance. Additionally, this approach offers an excellent etendue compared to others and is immune to speckle decorrelation. The etendue is essentially a measure of the size of the collection field with respect to both the acceptance angle and area of the detector. Consequently, spectral hole burning has seen the most work in recent years within the field of UOT. However, limitations in the practicality of the method have stunted its transition into in vivo imaging applications. These limitations include the need for rare-earth materials, although this has become less of an issue with progress in materials capabilities, and the requirement of the filter material to be cryogenically cooled to less than 5 K.

== Time-Resolved Frequency-Swept UOT (Forward model) ==
For single-frequency UOT, the axial resolution along ultrasonic axis is always limited by the elongated ultrasonic focal zone. To improve the axial resolution, Ultrasonic frequency-swept UOT model is designed. In this system, the object is placed in a tank full of UOT scattering medium. There will also be an ultrasound absorber at the bottom of the tank to avoid rebound of ultrasound. Basically, a function generator will produce a frequency signal relating to time. After passing through a power amplifier and a transformer, such frequency command will be sent to the ultrasonic transducer to generate ultrasonic beam with different frequencies. After a brief calculation, a focused ultrasonic beam will be sent to the medium and the target. Meanwhile, a laser beam which is perpendicular to the ultrasonic beam will also illuminate the scattering medium. Then, on the other side of the light source, the PMT, modulated by frequency signal sent through the first function generator will detect transmitted light signal within the tank and transfer the optical signal to electrical signal. The electrical signal will then pass through an amplifier, an Oscilloscope and be stored in the data base.

With such data base, spectral intensity vs frequency plots at multiple points can be generated (The first spectrum is generated as a reference, produced by optical signal far from the object.). Each of the spectrum can then be further converted to a 1D image showing the interior of the medium in the direction perpendicular to the tank (z direction). In the end, all the 1D image will be pieced together to generate a full view inside the medium.

In summary, a frequency-swept (chirped) ultrasonic wave can encode laser light traversing the acoustic axis with various frequencies. Decoding the transmitted light provides resolution along the acoustic axis. This scheme is analogous to MRI.

== Development ==
Was first proposed as a method for virus detection in 2013.

Recent advances in UOT (2020 onwards) include 1) the development of Coded Ultrasound Transmissions for SNR gain in AOI, 2) the development of Homodyne Time of Flight AOI, 3) the use of super-resolution techniques to improve UOT beyond the acoustic diffraction limit, and 4) the use of coaxial interferometry to better enable modern high-performance cameras for parallel detection of UOT signals.

1. Levi et al. discovered that the use of coded sequences of acoustic pulses can turn the speckle modulation at every time instant into the sum of acoustically modulated regions. CT-AOI can keep the spatial resolution from single cycle ultrasound pulses while increasing SNR by the half of the square root of the number of cycles. In this paper, Levi et al. use 79 cycles to gain an experimental 4 times increase to the SNR.
2. As a follow-up to their previous work, Levi et al. developed a homodyne AOI scheme enabling the detection of tagged detection with a single low-gain photodetector. This method leads to a 4 times SNR increase over more traditional high-gain photodetectors, such as photomultiplier tubes. In this homodyne time-of-flight AOI system, the reemitted light is not detected directly but is rather interfered with a reference beam in a homodyne configuration. The interference leads to an optical amplification of the US-modulated light, enabling its detection with low-gain photodetectors with a bandwidth that is higher than the AO modulation frequency. This setup does not temporally integrate the signal, allowing for much more flexibility regarding speckle decorrelation. This is because the measurement signal can be divided in post-processing, allowing the analysis of time windows wherein the speckles are stable.
3. Doktofksy et al. utilized super-resolution optical fluctuations imaging (SOFI) techniques to gain massive improvements to spatial resolution in UOT. Naturally fluctuating speckle grains present in UOT images are analogous to blinking fluorophores in SOFI, which enables super-resolution.
4. Normally, single-pixel detectors (e.g. photodiode) are used in UOT. These detectors suffer from limited dynamic range, which causes difficulties with low modulation depth. Modulation depth can be enhanced by using multiple pixels in parallel; the enhancement is equal to N ^ (1/2), where N represents the number of pixels. Modern high-performance cameras have millions of pixels but have low temporal resolution (slow framerate and long exposure time). Lin et al. tackled this issue by designing a system with paired illumination from two co-propagated beams with slightly different optical frequencies.
