= Computed tomography imaging spectrometer =

Method of capturing a multi-wavelength data cube

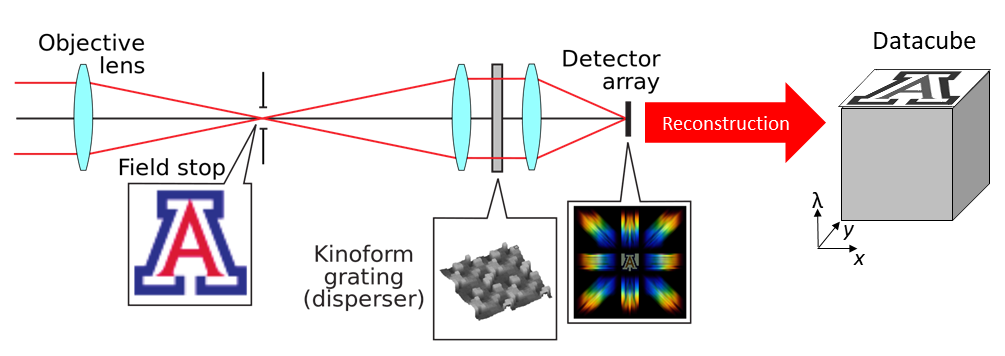
The optical layout and reconstruction step of a CTIS instrument. Shown here is an example in which the device is imaging the university of Arizona's logo, uses a kinoform grating to disperse the transmitted light, and measures a 3 × 3 dispersion pattern on the detector array.

The computed tomography imaging spectrometer (CTIS) is a snapshot imaging spectrometer which can produce in fine the three-dimensional (i.e. spatial and spectral) hyperspectral datacube of a scene.

== History ==
The CTIS was conceived separately by Takayuki Okamoto and Ichirou Yamaguchi at Riken (Japan), and by F. Bulygin and G. Vishnakov in Moscow (Russia). The concept was subsequently further developed by Michael Descour, at the time a PhD student at the University of Arizona, under the direction of Prof. Eustace Dereniak.

The first research experiments based on CTIS imaging were conducted in the fields of molecular biology. Several improvements of the technology have been proposed since then, in particular regarding the hardware: dispersive elements providing more information on the datacube, enhanced calibration of the system. The enhancement of the CTIS was also fueled by the general development of bigger image sensors. For academic purposes, although not as widely used as other spectrometers, CTIS has been employed in applications ranging from the military to ophthalmology and astronomy.

== Image formation ==
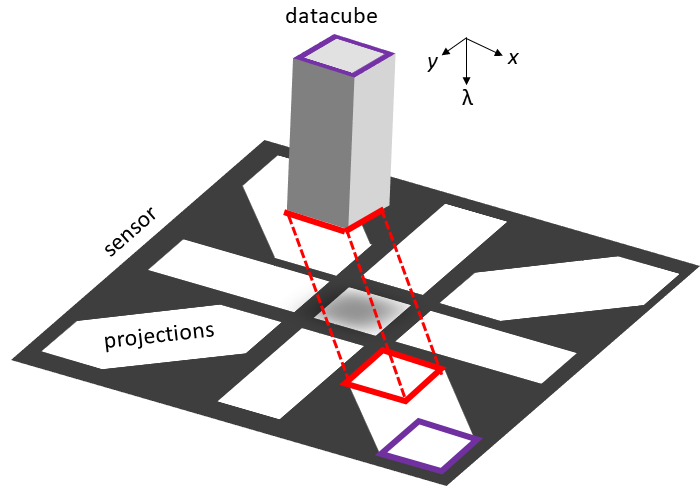
Formation of a CTIS image, viewed as mechanical projections of a theoretical datacube. Image inspired by the work of Descour.

=== Optical layout ===
The optical layout of a CTIS instrument is shown on the left part of the top image. A field stop is placed at the image plane of an objective lens, after which a lens collimates the light before it passes through a disperser (such as a grating or a prism). Finally, a re-imaging lens maps the dispersed image of the field stop onto a large-format detector array.

=== Resulting image ===
The information that the CTIS acquires can be seen as the three-dimensional datacube of the scene. Of course, this cube does not exist in physical space as mechanical objects do, but this representation helps to gain intuition on what the image is capturing: As seen in the figure on the right, the shapes on the image can be considered as projections (in a mechanical sense) of the datacube.

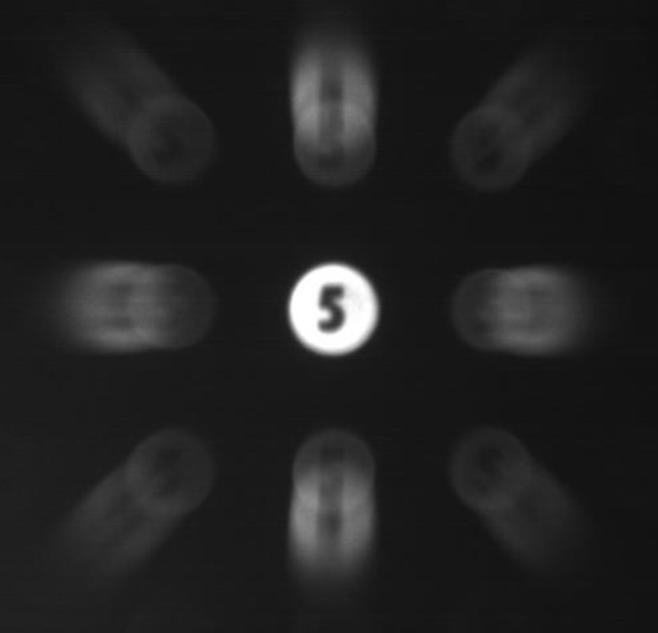
Image of a CTIS acquisition. The acquired object is a number written on a transparent screen, illuminated by a LED light.

The central projection, called the 0th order of diffraction, is the sum of the datacube following the spectral axis (hence, this projection acts as a panchromatic camera). In the image of the "5" on the right, one can clearly read the number in the central projection, but with no information regarding the spectre of the light.

All the other projections result from "looking" at the cube obliquely and hence contain a mixture of spatial and spectral information. From a discrete point of view where the datacube is considered as a set of spectral slices (as in the figure above, where two such slices are represented in purple and red), one can understand these projections as a partial spread of the stack of slices, similarly to a magician spreading his cards in order for an audience member to pick one of them. For typical spectral dispersions and sensor size, the spectral information of a given slice is heavily overlapping with the one from other neighboring slices. In the "5" image, one can see in the side projections that the number is not clearly readable (loss of spatial information), but that some spectral information is available (i.e. some wavelengths appear brighter than others). Hence, the image contains multiplexed information regarding the datacube.

The number and layout of the projections depend on the type of diffracting element employed. In particular, more than one order of diffraction can be captured.

== Datacube reconstruction ==
The resulting image contains all of the information of the datacube. It is necessary to carry out a reconstruction algorithm to convert this image back in the 3D spatio-spectral space. Hence, the CTIS is a computational imaging system.

=== Link to X-ray computed tomography ===
Conceptually, one can consider each of the projections of the datacube in a manner analogous to the X-ray projections measured by medical X-ray computed tomography instruments used to estimate the volume distribution within a patient's body.

Similarities between X-ray CT and CTIS acquisitions
	X-ray CT	CTIS
Object to acquire	Slice of a patient's body (2D)	Spatio-spectral datacube (3D)
Penetrating wave	X-ray	Light from the scene
Projection generator	Transmitters rotating around an axis	Dispersive element
Image acquired	Sinogram	CTIS multiplexed image

Hence, the most widely-used algorithms for CTIS reconstruction are the same as the one used in the X-ray CT field of study. In particular, the algorithm used by Descour is directly taken from a seminal work in X-ray CT reconstruction. Since then, slightly more elaborate techniques have been employed, in the same way (but not to the same extent) X-ray CT reconstruction has improved since the 80s.

=== Difficulties ===
Compared to the X-ray CT field, CTIS reconstruction is notoriously more difficult. In particular, the number of projections resulting from a CTIS acquisition is typically far less than in X-ray CT. This results in a blurrier reconstruction, following the projection-slice theorem. Moreover, unlike X-ray CT where projections are acquired around the patient, the CTIS, as all imaging systems, only acquires the scene from a single point of view, and hence many projection angles are unobtainable.
