= Tomography =

Imaging by sections or sectioning using a penetrative wave

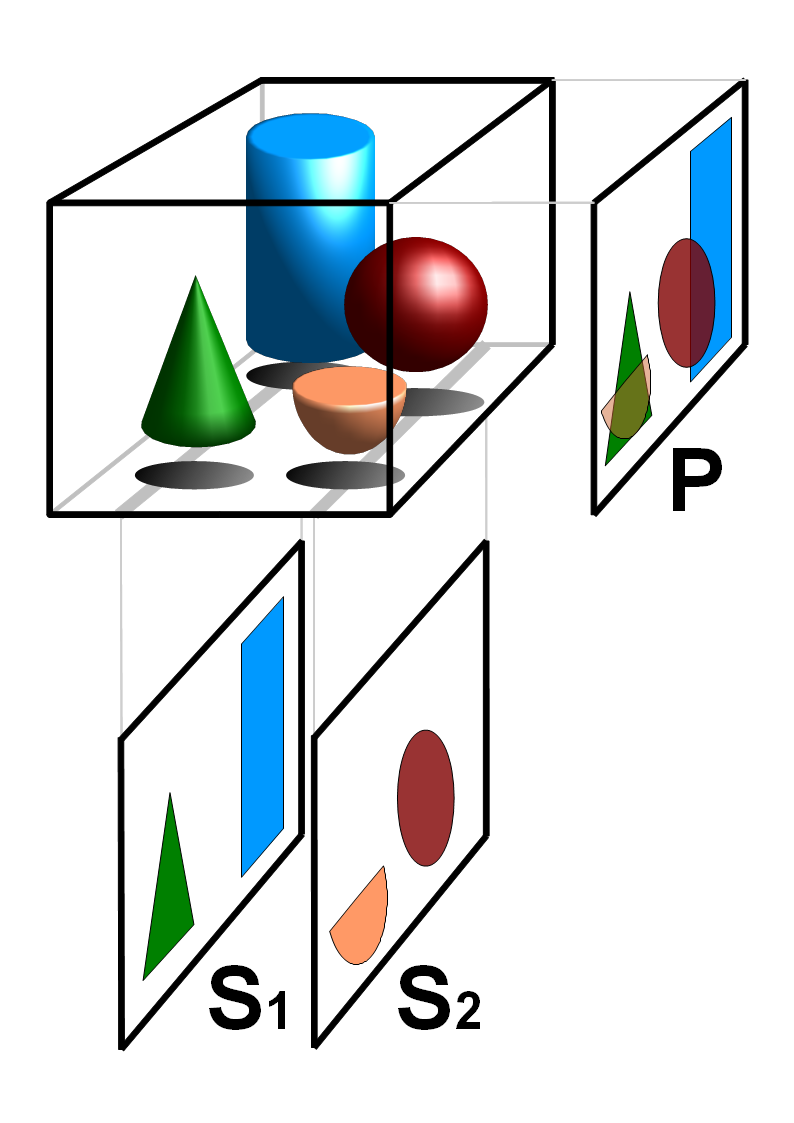
Fig.1: Basic principle of tomography: superposition free tomographic cross sections S_{1} and S_{2} compared with the (not tomographic) projected image P

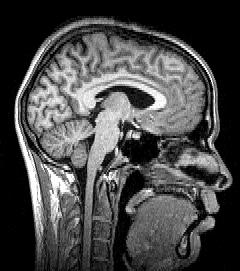
Median plane sagittal tomography of the head by magnetic resonance imaging

Tomography is imaging by sections or sectioning that uses any kind of penetrating wave. The method is used in radiology, archaeology, biology, atmospheric science, geophysics, oceanography, plasma physics, materials science, cosmochemistry, astrophysics, quantum information, and other areas of science.

The word tomography is derived from Ancient Greek τόμος, tomos 'slice, section' and γράφω, graphō 'to write' or, in this context as well, 'to describe'. A device used in tomography is called a tomograph, while the image produced is a tomogram.

In many cases, the production of these images is based on the mathematical procedure tomographic reconstruction, such as X-ray computed tomography technically being produced from multiple projectional radiographs. Many different reconstruction algorithms exist. Most algorithms fall into one of two categories: filtered back projection (FBP) and iterative reconstruction (IR). These procedures give inexact results: they represent a compromise between accuracy and computation time required. FBP demands fewer computational resources, while IR generally produces fewer artifacts (errors in the reconstruction) at a higher computing cost.

Although MRI (magnetic resonance imaging), optical coherence tomography and ultrasound are transmission methods, they typically do not require movement of the transmitter to acquire data from different directions. In MRI, both projections and higher spatial harmonics are sampled by applying spatially varying magnetic fields; no moving parts are necessary to generate an image. On the other hand, since ultrasound and optical coherence tomography uses time-of-flight to spatially encode the received signal, it is not strictly a tomographic method and does not require multiple image acquisitions.

== Types of tomography ==
Name	Source of data	Abbreviation	Year of introduction
Aerial tomography	Electromagnetic radiation	AT	2020
Array tomography	Correlative light and electron microscopy	AT	2007
Atom probe tomography	Atom probe	APT	1986
Computed tomography imaging spectrometer	Visible light spectral imaging	CTIS	2001
Computed tomography of chemiluminescence	Chemiluminescence Flames	CTC	2009
Confocal microscopy (laser scanning confocal microscopy)	Laser scanning confocal microscopy	LSCM	
Cryogenic electron tomography	Cryogenic transmission electron microscopy	CryoET	
Electrical capacitance tomography	Electrical capacitance	ECT	1988
Electrical capacitance volume tomography	Electrical capacitance	ECVT	
Electrical resistivity tomography	Electrical resistivity	ERT	
Electrical impedance tomography	Electrical impedance	EIT	1984
Atomic Mineral Resonance Tomography	Atomic Mineral Resonance Frequency	AMRT	
Electron tomography	Transmission electron microscopy	ET	1968
Focal plane tomography	X-ray		1930s
Functional magnetic resonance imaging	Magnetic resonance	fMRI	1992
Gamma-ray emission tomography ("Tomographic Gamma Scanning")	Gamma ray	TGS or ECT	
Gamma-ray transmission tomography	Gamma ray	TCT	
Hydraulic tomography	fluid flow	HT	2000
Infrared microtomographic imaging	Mid-infrared		2013
Laser Ablation Tomography	Laser ablation & fluorescent microscopy	LAT	2013
Magnetic induction tomography	Magnetic induction	MIT	
Magnetic particle imaging	Superparamagnetism	MPI	2005
Magnetic resonance imaging or nuclear magnetic resonance tomography	Nuclear magnetic moment	MRI or MRT	
Multi-source tomography	X-ray		
Muon tomography	Muon		
Microwave tomography	Microwave		
Neutron tomography	Neutron		
Neutron stimulated emission computed tomography			
Ocean acoustic tomography	Sonar	OAT	
Optical coherence tomography	Interferometry	OCT	
Optical diffusion tomography	Absorption of light	ODT	
Optical projection tomography	Optical microscope	OPT	
Photoacoustic imaging in biomedicine	Photoacoustic spectroscopy	PAT	
Photoemission orbital tomography	Angle-resolved photoemission spectroscopy	POT	2009
Positron emission tomography	Positron emission	PET	
Positron emission tomography - computed tomography	Positron emission & X-ray	PET-CT	
Quantum tomography	Quantum state	QST	
Single-photon emission computed tomography	Gamma ray	SPECT	
Seismic tomography	Seismic waves		
Terahertz tomography	Terahertz radiation	THz-CT	
Thermoacoustic imaging	Photoacoustic spectroscopy	TAT	
Ultrasound-modulated optical tomography	Ultrasound	UOT	
Ultrasound computer tomography	Ultrasound	USCT	
Ultrasound transmission tomography	Ultrasound		
X-ray computed tomography	X-ray	CT, CAT scan	1971
X-ray microtomography	X-ray	microCT	
Zeeman-Doppler imaging	Zeeman effect		

Some recent advances rely on using simultaneously integrated physical phenomena, e.g. X-rays for both CT and angiography, combined CT/MRI and combined CT/PET.

Discrete tomography and Geometric tomography, on the other hand, are research areas that deal with the reconstruction of objects that are discrete (such as crystals) or homogeneous. They are concerned with reconstruction methods, and as such they are not restricted to any of the particular (experimental) tomography methods listed above.

=== Synchrotron X-ray tomographic microscopy ===
A new technique called synchrotron X-ray tomographic microscopy (SRXTM) allows for detailed three-dimensional scanning of fossils.

The construction of third-generation synchrotron sources combined with the tremendous improvement of detector technology, data storage and processing capabilities since the 1990s has led to a boost of high-end synchrotron tomography in materials research with a wide range of different applications, e.g. the visualization and quantitative analysis of differently absorbing phases, microporosities, cracks, precipitates or grains in a specimen. Synchrotron radiation is created by accelerating free particles in high vacuum. By the laws of electrodynamics this acceleration leads to the emission of electromagnetic radiation (Jackson, 1975). Linear particle acceleration is one possibility, but apart from the very high electric fields one would need it is more practical to hold the charged particles on a closed trajectory in order to obtain a source of continuous radiation. Magnetic fields are used to force the particles onto the desired orbit and prevent them from flying in a straight line. The radial acceleration associated with the change of direction then generates radiation.

== Volume rendering ==
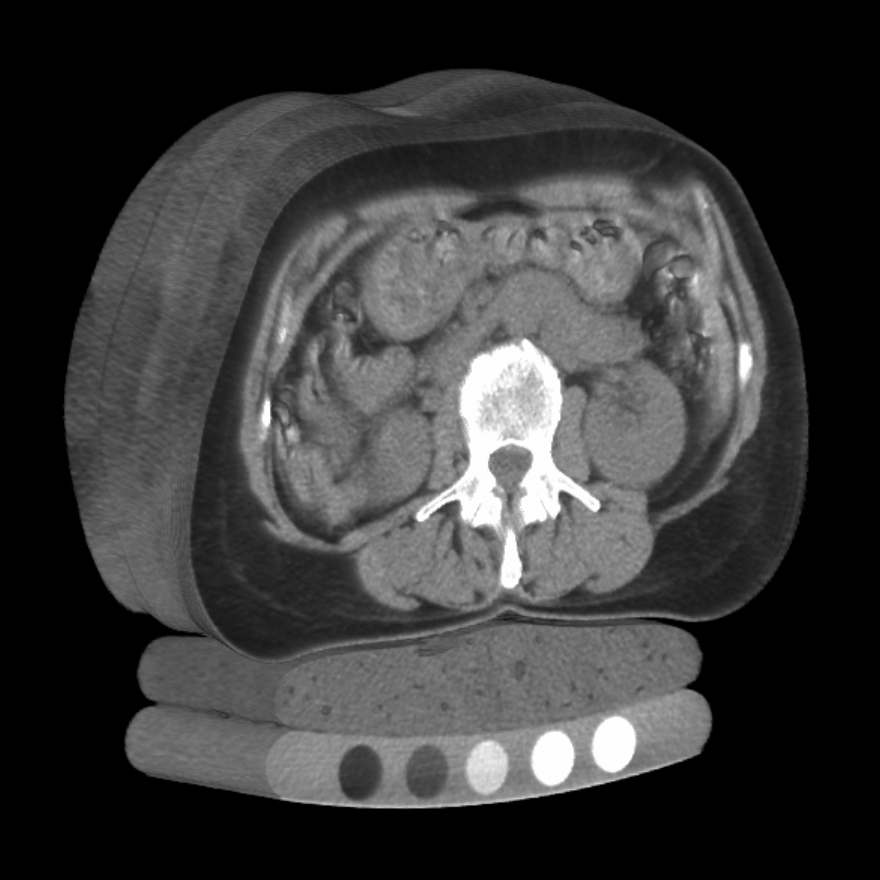
Multiple X-ray computed tomographs (with quantitative mineral density calibration) stacked to form a 3D model

Volume rendering is a set of techniques used to display a 2D projection of a 3D discretely sampled data set, typically a 3D scalar field. A typical 3D data set is a group of 2D slice images acquired, for example, by a CT, MRI, or MicroCT scanner. These are usually acquired in a regular pattern (e.g., one slice every millimeter) and usually have a regular number of image pixels in a regular pattern. This is an example of a regular volumetric grid, with each volume element, or voxel represented by a single value that is obtained by sampling the immediate area surrounding the voxel.

To render a 2D projection of the 3D data set, one first needs to define a camera in space relative to the volume. Also, one needs to define the opacity and color of every voxel. This is usually defined using an RGBA (for red, green, blue, alpha) transfer function that defines the RGBA value for every possible voxel value.

For example, a volume may be viewed by extracting isosurfaces (surfaces of equal values) from the volume and rendering them as polygonal meshes or by rendering the volume directly as a block of data. The marching cubes algorithm is a common technique for extracting an isosurface from volume data. Direct volume rendering is a computationally intensive task that may be performed in several ways.

== History ==
Focal plane tomography was developed in the 1930s by the radiologist Alessandro Vallebona, and proved useful in reducing the problem of superimposition of structures in projectional radiography.

In a 1953 article in the medical journal Chest, B. Pollak of the Fort William Sanatorium described the use of planography, another term for tomography.

Focal plane tomography remained the conventional form of tomography until being largely replaced by mainly computed tomography in the late 1970s. Focal plane tomography uses the fact that the focal plane appears sharper, while structures in other planes appear blurred. By moving an X-ray source and the film in opposite directions during the exposure, and modifying the direction and extent of the movement, operators can select different focal planes which contain the structures of interest.

== See also ==
- Chemical imaging
- 3D reconstruction
- Discrete tomography
- Geometric tomography
- Geophysical imaging
- Industrial computed tomography
- Johann Radon
- Medical imaging
- Network tomography
- Nonogram – a type of puzzle based on a discrete model of tomography
- Radon transform
- Tomographic reconstruction
- Multiscale tomography
- Voxel
