= Philip F. Cohen =

Canadian nuclear medicine physician and biomedical scientist

Philip F. Cohen (born September 3, 1950) is a Canadian clinical director of Nuclear Medicine working out of the Lions Gate Hospital in North Vancouver, British Columbia. As a nuclear medicine physician, he is a pioneer in the usage of 3-D imaging techniques to improve diagnosis of bone disease and injury in collaboration with the Medical Imaging Research Group at University of British Columbia. Furthermore, Cohen has been involved in clinical research trials of new radiopharmaceuticals. To that effect, Cohen was the first recipient of a research grant from the Lions Gate Hospital Foundation, one of several peer-reviewed awards that would follow.

== Early life ==
Cohen was born and raised in Calgary, Alberta, Canada, the eldest son of community builders and philanthropists, Harry B. Cohen and Martha Cohen who, by their very own example, taught him the imperatives of community service and pursuit of humanitarian ideals.

== School and early career ==
Cohen graduated summa cum laude in 1972 from Dartmouth College, where he was a member of Phi Beta Kappa, and majored in economics. He completed his medical degree at the University of Toronto and his internship at Holy Cross Hospital in Calgary. Cohen trained in Internal Medicine at the University of Calgary, then went on to study radiology and obtain his Nuclear Medicine Residency at the University of Western Ontario; there he obtained certification as a Specialist in Nuclear Medicine from the Royal College of Physicians and Surgeons of Canada and the American Board of Nuclear Medicine. He has been the Division Head of Nuclear Medicine at Lions Gate Hospital since 1983 and was appointed in 2010 to be Clinical Professor of Radiology at University of British Columbia.

== Prostate cancer research ==
After witnessing the agonizing illness of a close childhood friend who initially fought off the ravages of a brain tumor, only to succumb to colorectal cancer, Cohen was inspired to enter the field of cancer research.

In 2017, Cohen led a study into a new radioactive tracer compound (99mTc-MIP-1404) for detecting and treating prostate cancer, as part of a large multi-centre trial involving Johns Hopkins Hospital, the Cleveland Clinic, as well as Canadian sites like the Jewish General Hospital in Montreal and the Calgary Prostate Centre.

According to Cohen, a big advantage with the new tracer compound is that it can be seen on regular nuclear medicine cameras (like CT scans and MRIs). It doesn't require a special PET scanner—which current tests do—so it can be performed in more hospitals, with more patients. Furthermore, the most exciting application of the new compound could be in fighting prostate cancer since Cohen conjectures that an agent can be attached to the tracer compound, one that can seek out and destroy prostate cancer cells.

== Other affiliations ==
- Past Chairman, Nuclear Medicine Accreditation Subcommittee, College of Physicians and Surgeons of British Columbia
- Executive Board Member, Canadian Association of Nuclear Medicine
- Editorial Board Member, Iranian Journal of Nuclear Medicine
- Co-founder, International Society for Applied Neuroimaging

== Philanthropy ==
For many years, with regard to equipment, the nuclear medicine department at Lions Gate Hospital lagged badly behind other Canadian hospitals. This sad state of affairs arose from an absence of funding by the British Columbia provincial government.

As a result, in 2014, the Lions Gate Hospital Foundation launched a fund-raising campaign and successfully raised $1.5 million for the purchase of two GE Optima SPECT-CT scanners and a GE bone densitometer. In the course of the campaign, Cohen matched funds, dollar-for-dollar, with 1700 community donors.

The new technology will be used for more detailed 3D localization of disease, as well as research collaborations with the Medical Imaging Research Group (MIRG) at the University of British Columbia. The primary goal: to develop precise radiation doses in clinical trials conducted in Vancouver toward the creation of new forms of cancer radiotherapy.

=== Dr. Philip Cohen Nuclear Medicine Centre ===
In 2015, in honor of Cohen's various contributions to Lions Gate Hospital, the Nuclear Medicine Department was renamed eponymously.

=== Pacific Nuclear Charitable Foundation ===
Established in 1994, Cohen created a private foundation to support the specialty of Nuclear Medicine.

== Honors ==
- Appointed to Scientific Advisory Board of Amen Clinics
- Advisory member of the Bone densitometry Accreditation Subcommittee for the Province of British Columbia.

== Publications ==
- Weinberg H, Johston B, Cohen P, Crisp D, Robertson A, Functional Imaging of Brain Responses to Repetitive Sensory Stimulation: Sources Estimated from EEG and SPECT, Brain Topography, Volume 2, Numbers 1–2, 1989
- Schober, P Cohen, D Lyster, B Lentle, Oct 1990, Journal of Nuclear Medicine, Diffuse Liver Uptake of I-131
- Lutz, Dougan, Riehla, Hudon, Cohen, Lyster: The Effect of Iodine Position on Uptake in the Mouse Using an Isomeric Series of 2-Deoxy 2-9-1-I123 Iodobenzyl Glucose, Journal of Labelled Compounds and Radiopharmaceuticals, Vol XXIX, No 5, 1991
- B Schober, P Cohen, B Lentle, Jan 1992 Journal of Nuclear Medicine, Optimal I-131 Radioiodine Dose in Graves Disease
- Hamilton CL, O'Hanlon D, Cohen P, Lyster DM, Banister EW. An acute phase response leads to plasma volume expansion in marathon runners and rheumatoid arthritis patients E. J. Applied Physiology and Occupation Phys 1994;69(Suppl):75,1994
- V Sossi, M Krzywinski, P Cohen, K Knitzek, K Hudkins, J De Rosario, KS Morrison, S Jivan, RR Johnson, TJ Ruth UBC/TRIUMF PERFORMANCE OF THE ADAC MCD DUAL HEAD COINCIDENCE CAMERA Abstract J of Nuclear Med, Vol 39., No 5, May 1998: 173P
- P Cohen, Recurrent Colorectal Metastatic lesion Identified by F-18 FDG Coincidence PET Scan, The Iranian Journal of Nuclear Medicine, Winter & Spring 2000, No 12 & 13, pg 12-16
- V Sossi, P. Cohen, K Hudkins, B Pointon, and TJ Ruth EFFECT OF SHIELDING ON IMAGE CONTRAST IN A DUAL HEAD COINCIDENCE GAMMA CAMERA, Abstract, J of Nuclear Med, Proceedings of the 47th Annual Meeting, June 2006)
- P Cohen, Unsuspected Case Multiple Myeloma in Sestamibi Myocardial Scan, in print Iranian Journal of Nuclear Medicine
- C Raji, D Pavel, T. Henderson, P Cohen, PLOS ONE, March 2014, Clinical Utility of SPECT Neuroimaging in the Diagnosis and Treatment of Traumatic Brain Injury: A Systematic Review
