= Jason S. Lewis =

British radiochemist (born 1970)

- Born: February 1970 (age 56); Liss, England
- Education: University of Essex; University of Kent
- Occupations: Radiochemist, professor
- Scientific career
- Fields: Molecular Imaging, radiochemistry
- Workplaces: Washington University in St. Louis; Memorial Sloan Kettering Cancer Center; Cornell University

Jason S. Lewis is a radiochemist and academic whose work relates to oncologic therapy and diagnosis. His research focus is a molecular imaging-based program focused on radiopharmaceutical development as well as the study of multimodality (PET, CT & MRI) small- and biomolecule-based agents and their clinical translation. He has worked on the development of small molecules as well as radiolabeled peptides and antibodies probing the overexpression of receptors and antigens on tumors.

He is the Emily Tow Chair, Deputy Director of the Sloan Kettering Institute (Office of Science Education and Training), and a Member and Professor at Memorial Sloan Kettering Cancer Center (MSK) in New York. Lewis has held leadership positions in scientific organizations and editorial boards.

== Education ==
Jason S. Lewis was born and raised in Hampshire, England. Lewis received his Bachelor of Science in chemistry, B.Sc. from the University of Essex in 1992. He received his Master of Science in chemistry from the University of Essex in 1993.

In November 1996, he received his Doctor of Philosophy in Biochemistry at the University of Kent.

== Career ==
Lewis was a member of faculty in Radiology at the Washington University School of Medicine, Mallinckrodt Institute of Radiology from 2000 to 2008. In 2008, Lewis joined Memorial Sloan Kettering Cancer Center where he became Laboratory Head in the Molecular Pharmacology and Chemistry Program at the Sloan Kettering Institute. He served as Director of the Radiochemistry and Molecular Imaging Probe Core until 2023 and was Chief Attending Radiochemist of the Radiochemistry and Imaging Sciences Service from 2010 to 2025.

He has also been Vice Chair of Research for the Department of Radiology at Memorial Hospital for Cancer and Allied Diseases from 2008 until 2025 and a tenured Member of MSK since 2010. From 2014 to 2022, he directed the Center for Molecular Imaging and Nanotechnology (CMINT).

In 2013, Lewis was named the Emily Tow Chair in Oncology. He was appointed Deputy Director of the Sloan Kettering Institute (Office of Science Education and Training) in 2025.

=== Academic appointments ===
Lewis is a professor at the Gerstner Sloan Kettering Graduate School of Biomedical Sciences Since 2010 and Professor of Pharmacology at Weill Cornell Medical College since 2015 and holds joint appointments in the Departments of Radiology and the Department of Pharmacology at Weill Cornell Medical School, NY.

In 2019, he became Adjunct Professor at the Medical University of Vienna, Austria.

=== Leadership and advisory roles ===
Lewis has served as president of the World Molecular Imaging Society and as president of the Society of Radiopharmaceutical Sciences. Since 2022, he has served as secretary/treasurer of the Society of Nuclear Medicine and Molecular Imaging (SNMMI), and has also held the position of vice-president-elect.

He has served on scientific advisory boards for academic institutions including Duke-NUS Medical School, King's College London, Imperial College London, and the University of Chicago, and on advisory boards for companies working in radiopharmaceutical development, including Clarity Pharmaceuticals and Telix Pharmaceuticals. In 2015, he co-founded pHLIP, Inc., and has served on its advisory board.

== Research focus ==
Lewis is a proponent of development imaging tools for use in personalized medicine. Lewis designs and develops radiochemical probes for use in nuclear medicine as well as multi-modality molecular imaging. The use of these probes span from oncological metabolic detection to understanding the biological processes of cancer and pharmacological modification. These probes can be used for biomarkers in clinical trials as well as used as an agent for oncological diagnostics. He has developed multiple new small molecules that target tumor metabolism, as well as radiolabeled peptides and antibodies for use in probing overexpression of receptors and antigens on tumors for research, clinical trials and in the clinic.

Lewis work has also contributed to imaging extracellular acidity in cancer, the application of click chemistry for antibody construction, and the use of ^89Zr-based radiopharmaceuticals for imaging biomarkers and oncogene status. Several of his research findings have advanced into clinical translation.

== Recognition ==
- 2014 Distinguished Investigator Award from the Academy of Radiology Research
- Fellow, World Molecular Imaging Society (FWMIS)
- 2017 Michael J. Welch Award, Society of Nuclear Medicine and Molecular Imaging (SNMMI)
- 2019 Paul C. Aebersold Award, Educational and Research Fund for Nuclear Medicine and Molecular Imaging (ERF) & Society of Nuclear Medicine and Molecular Imaging
- 2019 Fellow, Society of Nuclear Medicine and Molecular Imaging (FSNMMI)
- Fellow, American Association for the Advancement of Science (2020)
- Elected Fellow, National Academy of Inventors (FNAI) (2025)
- Elected Fellow, American Institute for Medical and Biological Engineering (AIMBE).(2022)

== Editorial board memberships ==
- Molecular Imaging and Biology (Editor-in-Chief)
- Journal of Nuclear Medicine (Associate Editor)
- ACS Bioconjugate Chemistry (Editorial Advisory Board)
- Nuclear Medicine and Biology (Associate Editor-in-Chief)

== Selected Publications ==
- Pratt EC, Mandleywala K, Bauer D, Bolaender A, Chao G, Castanares MA, Collins EC, Lewis JS. ImmunoPET for mesothelin positive tissues using bio-orthogonal in-vivo click chemistry. Nucl Med Biol. 2025 Jul 15;148-149:109051. doi: 10.1016/j.nucmedbio.2025.109051. [Epub ahead of print] PubMed PMID: 40694891; PubMed Central PMCID: PMC12328198.
- Mack KN, Bauer D, Carter LM, Carrasco SE, Atmane MI, Viray TD, Brooks CL, Hollingsworth MA, Radhakrishnan P, Lewis JS. Pretargeted alpha therapy in MUC16-positive high-grade serous ovarian cancer. Nucl Med Biol. 2025 Jan-Feb;140-141:108976. doi: 10.1016/j.nucmedbio.2024.108976. Epub 2024 Nov 22. PubMed PMID: 39615062; PubMed Central PMCID: PMC12404150.
- Bauer D, De Gregorio R, Pratt EC, Bell A, Michel A, Lewis JS. Examination of the PET in vivo generator (134)Ce as a theranostic match for (225)Ac. Eur J Nucl Med Mol Imaging. 2024 Nov;51(13):4015-4025. doi: 10.1007/s00259-024-06811-w. Epub 2024 Jun 28. PubMed PMID: 38940841; PubMed Central PMCID: PMC12121724.
- Arroyo A, Lyashchenko SK, Lewis JS. Methods for the Production of Radiolabeled Bioagents for ImmunoPET. Methods Mol Biol. 2024;2729:117-142. doi: 10.1007/978-1-0716-3499-8_8. Review. PubMed PMID: 38006494; PubMed Central PMCID: PMC11330323.
- Zeglis BM, Lewis JS. Click Here for Better Chemistry. N Engl J Med. 2022 Dec 15;387(24):2291-2293. doi: 10.1056/NEJMcibr2213596. Epub 2022 Nov 30. PubMed PMID: 36449446; PubMed Central PMCID: PMC10501737.
