= Hossein Jadvar =

Iranian-American nuclear medicine physician-scientist

- Born: 1961 (age 64–65)
- Occupations: Nuclear medicine physician-scientist, academic, author, lecturer, inventor
- Known for: His clinical and research work in molecular imaging and theranostics in cancer, particularly prostate cancer
- Awards: Lifetime Achievement Award, American College of Nuclear Medicine; Distinguished Scientist Award, Western Regional Society of Nuclear Medicine and Molecular Imaging (renamed Sanjiv S. Gambhir Distinguished Scientist Award); Distinguished Investigator Award, Academy for Radiology and Biomedical Research

Academic background
- Education: B.S. (Chemical Engineering, 1982), (Note: From Iowa State University) M.S. (Biomedical Engineering, 1984), (Note: From the University of Wisconsin) M.S.E (Computer Engineering, 1986), (Note: From the University of Michigan, Ann Arbor) Ph.D. (Bioengineering, 1988), M.D. (1993), (Note: From the University of Chicago's Pritzker School of Medicine) M.P..H. (2005), (Note: From Harvard University) M.B.A. (2007), (Note: From the USC Marshall School of Business) MSL (Law Studies, 2024) (Note: From the USC Gould School of Law)
- Thesis: Computer analysis of the electrocardiogram for detection of myocardial ischemia during transesophageal atrial pacing stress (1988)
- Doctoral advisor: Janice Jenkins
- Other advisor: Robert Arzbaecher

Academic work
- Discipline: Nuclear medicine, diagnostic radiology, biomedical engineering
- Sub-discipline: Molecular imaging, cancer theranostics, prostate cancer, hybrid imaging, targeted radionuclide therapy
- Institutions: The Keck School of Medicine and the Viterbi School of Engineering, University of Southern California
- Website: keck.usc.edu/faculty-search/hossein-jadvar/

Hossein Jadvar is an Iranian-American nuclear medicine physician-scientist, academic, author, lecturer, and inventor specializing in molecular imaging and cancer theranostics, particularly for prostate cancer. He is a tenured Professor of Radiology at the University of Southern California (USC), holding joint appointments in Urology, Radiation Oncology, and Biomedical Engineering. (Note: Professor of Urology, Professor of Radiation Oncology, Professor of Biomedical Engineering) Jadvar is affiliated with the Keck School of Medicine of USC and the USC Norris Comprehensive Cancer Center. He served as the 2013-14 president of the American College of Nuclear Medicine (ACNM) and the 2015-16 president of the Society of Nuclear Medicine and Molecular Imaging (SNMMI), and has served in the U.S. Nuclear Regulatory Commission (NRC) Advisory Committee on the Medical Uses of Isotopes (ACMUI) since 2019, as the Vice Chair during 2022-24 and as the Chair of the committee since 2024. Jadvar received the 2014 Distinguished Investigator from the Academy for Radiology and Biomedical Imaging Research. He served as the 2023-25 President of the SNMMI Therapy Center of Excellence.

== Early life and education ==
Hossein Jadvar was born in Tehran, Iran on April 6, 1961. He graduated from Alborz High School in 1978 and moved to the United States to pursue his higher education and became a naturalized U.S. citizen in 1995. Jadvar completed a B.S. in Chemical Engineering from Iowa State University in 1982, followed by an M.S. in Biomedical Engineering from the University of Wisconsin-Madison in 1984. He obtained an M.S.E. in Computer Engineering and a Ph.D. in Bioengineering both from the University of Michigan, Ann Arbor, in 1986 and 1988, respectively. He pursued his medical degree at the University of Chicago's Pritzker School of Medicine, graduating in 1993. He completed his internship in internal medicine at University of California, San Francisco (1993-1994), and residency training at Stanford University (1994–98), (Note: Jadvar was Chief Resident in Nuclear Medicine at Stanford from 1997 to 1998) specializing in diagnostic radiology and nuclear medicine. He completed a fellowship in nuclear oncology at the Harvard Medical School Joint Program in Nuclear Medicine (JPNM) with the majority of his training obtained in Department of Radiology at Massachusetts General Hospital. Jadvar also holds an M.P.H. from Harvard University (2005), an executive M.B.A. from USC Marshall School of Business (2007), and an M.S.L. (Master of Studies in Law) from USC Gould School of Law (2024). He has completed executive education in clinical effectiveness at Harvard Medical School and in leadership at the Wharton School of Business at University of Pennsylvania.

== Career and contributions ==
Jadvar has contributed to the fields of molecular imaging and theranostics in cancer, with a focus on prostate cancer. Jadvar is affiliated with the Keck School of Medicine of USC and the USC Norris Comprehensive Cancer Center. Jadvar has held senior positions including as Director of the American Board of Nuclear Medicine. His work in molecular imaging and radiopharmaceutical therapy focuses on prostate cancer.

In a 2009 interview, Jadvar explained that nuclear medicine is a branch of medicine and medical imaging that uses small amounts of radioactive materials, known as radiotracers or radiopharmaceuticals, to diagnose and treat diseases by focusing on the physiological processes of the body rather than anatomical structures, as seen in modalities like CT or MRI. He traced its origins back to post-World War II and its growing significance in diagnostics and therapy, with applications in neurology, cardiology, oncology and infectious and inflammatory diseases.

Jadvar contributed to the Lancet Oncology Commission report, which identified and expanded on strategic priorities for advancing cancer research and treatment in the United States. The report pointed out to innovative approaches in cancer prevention, early detection, treatment, and survivorship, emphasizing the role of interdisciplinary collaboration and technologies like genomic and immune profiling. His contributions were included in the recommendations of the Lancet Oncology Commission report, which outlined priorities for cancer research and treatment.

Jadvar chaired the "Pathways to the Future of Nuclear Medicine Task Force," which proposed alternative training pathways aimed at addressing challenges in nuclear medicine training and enhancing collaboration with diagnostic radiology. The task force proposed alternative and innovative training pathways to ensure comprehensive education, adapt to evolving clinical demands, and maintain nuclear medicine's independence while enhancing interdisciplinary cooperation. These efforts aimed to encourage a robust workforce and advance the quality of patient care in the field.

Jadvar was appointed as the nuclear medicine physician representative on the Advisory Committee on the Medical Uses of Isotopes (ACMUI) in October 2019. The committee advises the U.S. Nuclear Regulatory Commission (NRC) on technical issues related to the regulation of medical uses of radioactive material. Jadvar’s research focuses on positron emission tomography, translational molecular imaging, and radiopharmaceutical therapy, particularly in prostate cancer.

== Selected publications ==
=== Books ===
- Jadvar, Hossein; Parker, J. Anthony. Clinical PET and PET/CT. Springer-Verlag, Inc., 2005. ISBN 1-85233-838-5
- Jadvar, Hossein; Colletti, Patrick M. Nuclear Medicine: The Essentials. Lippincott Williams & Wilkins, 2022. ISBN 978-1-4963-00645
- Jadvar, Hossein; Jacene, Heather; Graham, Michael (eds.) Molecular Imaging: An Introduction. Cambridge University Press, 2017 ISBN 978-1-107-62128-2
- Gholamrezanejad, Ali; Assadi, Majid; Jadvar, Hossein. Radiology-Nuclear Medicine Diagnostic Imaging: A Correlative Approach. John Wiley & Sons Ltd., 2023. ISBN 978-1-1196-60361

=== Articles ===
- Jadvar H, Jenkins JM, Stewart RE, Schwaiger M, Arzbaecher RC. Computer analysis of the electrocardiogram during esophageal pacing cardiac stress. IEEE Trans Biomed Eng 1991; 38(11): 1089-1099. PMID 1748443
- Xie J, Wang G-J, Cela CJ, Humayun M, Weiland J, Lazzi G, Jadvar H. Modeling and percept of transcorneal electrical stimulation in humans. IEEE Trans Biomed Eng 2010; 58(7):1932-9. PMID 20952323
- Jadvar H, Yap L-P, Park R, Li Z, Chen K, Hughes L, Kouhi A, Conti PS. [18F]-2’-fluoro-5-methyl-1-beta-D-arabinofuranosyluracil (18F-FMAU) in prostate cancer: initial preclinical observations. Mol Imaging 2012; 11:426-32. PMID 22954187
- Jadvar H, Desai B, Ji L, Groshen S, Conti PS, Dorff T, Pinski J, Quinn D. Baseline 18F-flurodeoxyglucose PET/CT parameters as imaging biomarkers of overall survival in castrate-resistant metastatic prostate cancer. J Nucl Med 2013; 54(8): 1195-1201. PMID 23785174
- Jadvar H, Colletti P, Delgado-Bolton R, Esposito G, Krause B, Iagaru A, Nadel H, Quinn D, Rohren E, Subramaniam R, Zukotynski K, Kauffman J, Ahuja S, Griffeth L: "Appropriate use criteria for 18F-FDG PET/CT in restaging and treatment response assessment of malignant disease", J Nucl Med 58(12):2026-2037; 2017. PMID 29025980
- Jaffee EM, Dang CV, Agus DB, Alexander BM, Anderson KC, Ashworth A, Barker AD, Bastani R, Bhatia S, Bluestone JA, Brawley O, Butte AJ, Coit DG, Davidson NE, Davis M, DePinho R, Diasio RB, Draetta G, Frazier AL, Futreal A, Gambhir SS, Ganz P, Garraway L, Gerson S, Gupta S, Heath J, Hoffman R, Hudis C, Hughes-Halbert C, Ibrahim R, Jadvar H, Kavanagh B, Kittles R, Le Q-T, Lippman SM, Mankoff D, Mardis ER, Mayer DK, McMasters K, Meropol NJ, Mitchell B, Naredi P, Ornish D, Pawlik TM, Peppercorn J, Pomper M, Raghavan D, Ritchie C, Schwarz S, Sullivan R, Wahl R, Wolchok JD, Wong SL, Yung A: “Future cancer research priorities in the USA: a Lancet Oncology Commission. Lancet Oncol 18(11):e653-e706; 2017. PMID 29208398
- Jadvar H, Velez EM, Desai B, Ji L, Quinn DI. Prediction of time to hormonal treatment failure in castrate sensitive metastatic prostate cancer with ^{18}F-FDG PET/CT. J Nucl Med 2019; 60(11):1524-1530. PMID 30926649
- Jadvar H, Chen K, Park R, Yap L-P, Vorobyova I, Swenson S, Markland FS. Preclinical evaluation of ^{64}Cu-labeled disintegrin for PET imaging of prostate cancer. Amino Acids 2019; 51(10-12):1569-1575. PMID 31621030
- Jadvar H, Ballas LK, Choyke PL, Fanti S, Gulley JL, Herrmann K, Hope TA, Klitzke AK, Oldan JD, Pomper MG, Rowe SP, Subramaniam RM, Taneja SS, Vargas HA, Ahuja S. Appropriate use criteria for imaging evaluation of biochemical recurrence of prostate cancer following definitive primary treatment. J Nucl Med 2020; 61(4):552-562. PMID 32238495
- Trabulsi EJ, Rumble RB, Jadvar H, Hope TA, Pomper MG, Turkbey B, Rosenkrantz AB, Verma S, Margolis DJ, Froemming A, Oto A, Purysko A, Milowski MI, Schlemmer H-P, Eiber M, Morris MJ, Choyke PL, Padhani A, Oldan J, Fanti S, Jain S, Pinto PA, Keegan KA, Porter CR, Coleman JA, Bauman GS, Jani AB, Kamraddt JM, Sholes W, Vargas A. Optimum imaging strategies for advanced prostate cancer: ASCO clinical practice guideline”, J Clin Oncol 38(17):1963-1996; 2020. PMID 31940221
- Velez EM, Desai B, Ji L, Quinn DI, Colletti PM, Jadvar H. Comparative prognostic implication of treatment response assessment in mCRPC: PERCIST 1.0, RECIST 1.1, and PSA Criteria. Theranostics 2020; 10(7):3254-3262. PMID 32194866
- Jadvar H, Calais J, Fanti S, Feng F, Greene KL, Gulley JL, Hofman M, Koontz BF, Lin DW, Morris MJ, Rowe SP, Royce TJ, Salami S, Savir-Baruch B, Srinivas S, Hope TA: “Appropriate use criteria for prostate-specific membrane antigen PET imaging”, J Nucl Med 63(1):59-68; 2022. PMID 34593595
- Jadvar H, Park R, Vorobyova I, Chen K. Tracking docetaxel-induced cellular proliferation changes in prostate tumor-bearing mice with [18F]FMAU PET. Acad Radiol 30(8):1721-1726; 2023. PMID 36184379

== Patents ==
- Metzger, William T., and Jadvar, Hossein. "Expandable esophageal catheter." Issued June 2, 1992. U.S. patent 5117828A
- Jadvar, Hossein. and Arzbaecher, Robert C., Method and apparatus for detection of posterior ischemia. Issued April 30, 1991. U.S. patent 5,010,888
- Metzger, William T., and Jadvar, Hossein. "Variable stiffness esophageal catheter." Issued June 5, 1990. U.S. patent 4,930,521
- Jadvar, Hossein, and Metzger, William T. "Multiple electrode affixable sheet." Issued December 3, 1991. U.S. patent 5,069,215

== Honors ==
- 2014 Academy for Radiology and Biomedical Imaging Research Distinguished Investigator Award
- World Association of Radiopharmaceutical and Molecular Therapy (WARMTH) Ajit Padhy Memorial Oration Lecture and Award

== Personal life ==
Jadvar lives in Pasadena, California. He is married and has two daughters.
