= Radioligand =

Radioactive biochemical substance used for diagnosis or for study of receptor systems

A radioligand is a microscopic particle which consists of a therapeutic radioactive isotope and the cell-targeting compound — the ligand. The ligand is the target binding site; it may be on the surface of the targeted cancer cell for therapeutic purposes. Radioisotopes can occur naturally or be synthesized and produced in a cyclotron/nuclear reactor. Types of radioisotopes include Y-90, H-3, C-11, Lu-177, Ac-225, Ra-223, In-111, I-131, and I-125. Thus, radioligands must be produced in special nuclear reactors for the radioisotope to remain stable. Radioligands can be used to analyze/characterize receptors, to perform binding assays, to help in diagnostic imaging, and to provide targeted cancer therapy. Radiation is a novel method of treating cancer and is effective in short distances along with being unique/personalizable and causing minimal harm to normal surrounding cells. Furthermore, radioligand binding can provide information about receptor-ligand interactions in vitro and in vivo. Choosing the right radioligand for the desired application is important. The radioligand must be radiochemically pure, stable, and demonstrate a high degree of selectivity, and high affinity for their target.

== History ==
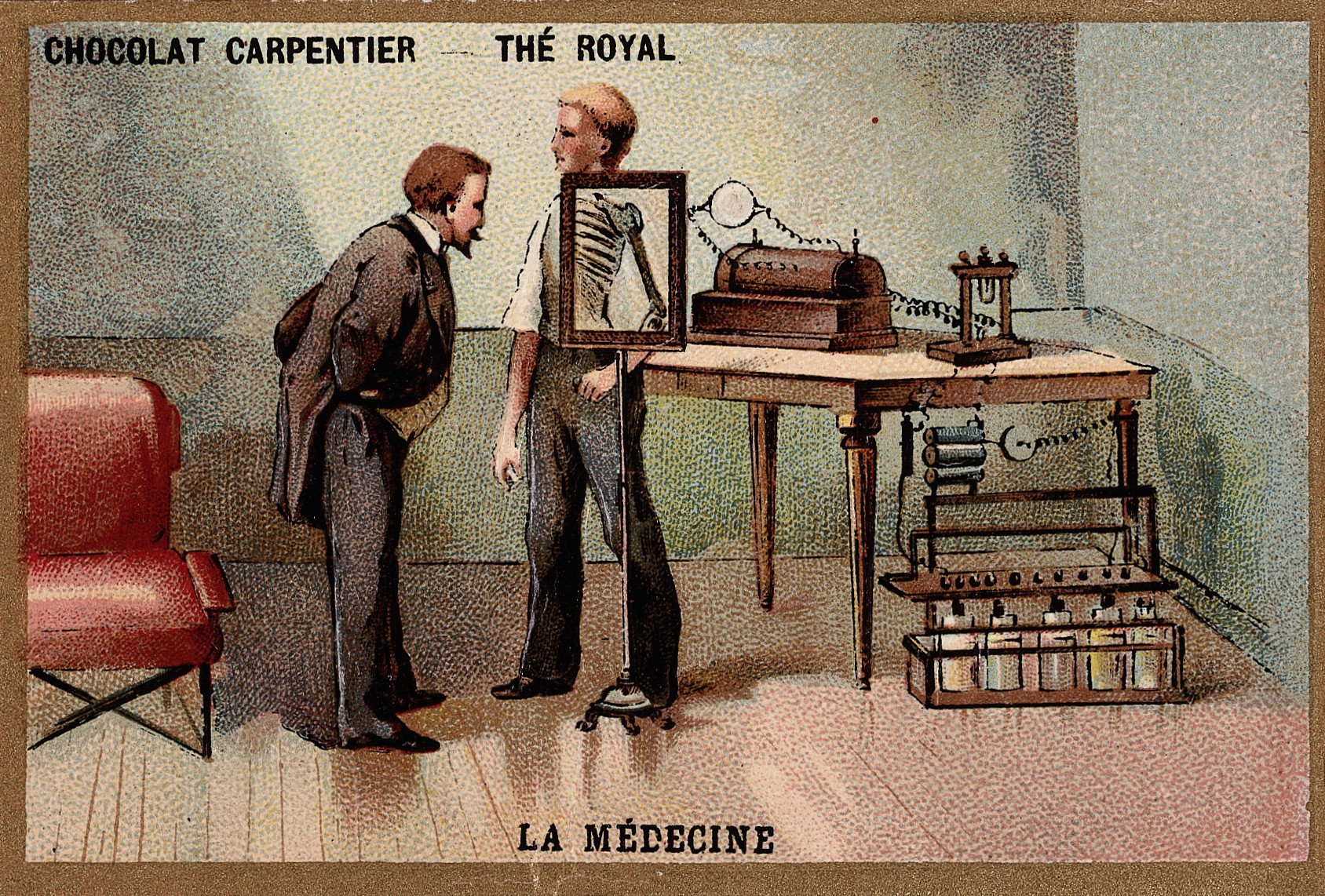
Depiction of Wilhelm Roentgen observing an X-ray

Wilhelm Roentgen is credited with the discovery of radioactivity in 1895 with many others such as Antoine Henri Becquerel, Pierre Curie, and Marie Curie following closely behind to further advance the field of radioactivity. John Lawrence, a physicist at The University of California Berkeley, first used nuclear medicine in humans came in 1936 after extensive use of radioactive phosphorus in mouse models. Often called the father of nuclear medicine, Lawrence treated a leukemia patient with radiophosphorus, which was the first time a radioactive isotope has been used to treat human patients. Another pioneer in the field, Sam Seidlin, in partnership with Saul Hertz, treated a case of thyroid cancer with radioactive iodine (I-131) 1946. In the 1950s, nuclear medicine began to gain traction as a medical specialty with the Society of Nuclear Medicine forming in 1954 and later releasing the first copy of the Journal of Nuclear Medicine in 1960. The use of radioligands and nuclear tagging started to gain popularity in the early 1960s when Elwood Jensen and Herbert Jacobsen (1962) and later Jack Gorski, David Toft, G, Shymala, Donald Smith, and Angelo Notides (1968) attempted to identify the estrogen receptor. The American Medical Association (AMA) officially recognized Nuclear Medicine as a medical specialty in 1970 and the American Board of Nuclear Medicine was established in 1972. Progress came quickly in 1973 when Edward Hoffman, Michael M. Ter-Pogossian, and Michael E. Phelps invented the first PET camera for human use. The 1980s brought early radioligand studies for neuroendocrine tumors (NETs) which continued into the early 2000s. In 2017 the European Union (EU) approved the use of radioligand therapy for NETs with the U.S. following close behind in 2018.

== Radioactive isotopes commonly used ==
Radioisotope	Half-life	Ray emission	Uses
Iodine-125	60 days	gamma rays	Iodine-125 is used in nuclear medicine for biological assays, as iso seeds for localized prostate cancer, and as internal radiation brachytherapy for cancers.
Iodine-123	13 hrs	gamma rays	Iodine-123 is preferred for diagnostics and imaging, especially for the thyroid, as it has a short half-life (13 hrs) and can clearly show the thyroid's uptake of iodine with lower radiation energy than I-131.
Iodine-131	8 days	beta particles gamma rays	Iodine-131 is used as a part, along with a urea based ligand MIP-1095 that binds specifically to the prostate membrane, of a radioligand therapy in clinical trials for metastatic prostate cancer.
Fluorine-18	109.7 minutes	beta positive decay (positron emission)	Fluorine-18 is used in PET imaging and radioligand diagnostics for the early detection of disease. Furthermore, since F-18 is a small lipophilic molecule, it can readily cross the blood brain barrier and be used in diagnostic imaging of glucose metabolism in the brain. Because it can bind to PET imaging ligands, it is used for detecting amyloid aggregation which indicates progression of Alzhiemer's disease in brain tissue.
Iridium-192	74 days	gamma rays	The most common uses of Iridium-192 are: cervical cancer, head, and neck cancer, and prostate cancer. Ir-192 can also be used in the radionuclide therapy called high-dose rate brachytherapy.
Xenon-133	5.2 days	beta and gamma emissions	Xe-133 is an inert gas that, along with CO2, can be inhaled to provide diagnostic information on the lung in adults and neonates using SPECT or nuclear imaging.
Yttrium-90	64 hours	pure beta emitter	Ytrium-90 can be used for internal radiation therapy to diagnose liver metastases. Y-90 emits the highest amount of beta radiation energy and can be used as radioligand therapy for B-cell non-Hodgkin Lymphoma or pancreatic cancer.
Carbon-11	20 minutes	positron emission	Carbon-11 can be used to find neuroinflammation through PET imaging of a specific translocator protein that indicates neuroinflammation if found. C-11 can also be used for PET radioligand imaging of serotonin transporters in the primate/pig brain cortical regions. C-11 is also very unstable and decays into stable Boron-11.
Indium-111	67 hours	gamma radiation (low-energy)	Indium-111 is unstable and decays by electron capture to a stable cadmium-111. It can be used for planar SPECT imaging for diagnostic purposes and diagnostic imaging of the presence of somatostatin receptors on various neuroendocrine tumors.
Tritium (Hydrogen-3) (H-3)	12 years	beta radiation	Hydrogen-3 is used for in vitro radioligand binding analysis of brain tissue and competition/saturation radioligand binding assays.
Strontium-89 (Sr-89)	50.5 days	beta radiation	Strontium-89 is used as a radioligand therapy for bone cancers to relieve bone pain as Sr-89 is easily absorbed in osseous tissue.
Lutetium-177	6.6 days	imageable gamma photons beta particles	Lutetium-177 is utilized for advanced metastatic prostate cancer or B-cell non-Hodgkin's lymphoma.
Radium-223	11.4 days	alpha particles	Radium-223 is a calcimimetic specifically used for advanced metastatic prostate cancer or B-cell non-Hodgkin's lymphoma.

== Ligands ==
Rendering of a G-protein coupled receptor (GPCR)

A ligand is a molecule utilized for cell-signaling that binds to a target tissue for cellular communication. There are many different types of ligands, including internal receptors, cell surface receptors, ion channel receptors, G protein-coupled receptors (GPCRs), and enzyme-linked receptors. Ligands can be divided into two categories, agonists or antagonists. Agonists behave similarly to natural ligands, while antagonists are inhibitors and block the binding of the natural ligand. There are many different subtypes of agonists, including endogenous agonists, super agonist, full agonist, inverse agonist, and irreversible agonist.

Radioligands are made up of the radioisotope, linker, and ligand. This structure allows the compound to identify and bind to the target tissue while retaining the ability to be tracked and imaged clinically. When a radioligand binds to its target, it alters the microenvironment of the receptor and surrounding tissue, partially due to the structure of the radioligand itself. Without both the high affinity ligand and the radioisotope, the efficiency of this process is lost.

== Use in drug delivery and release ==
Radioligands are administered through four main routes: intravenously, subcutaneous injection, intraperitoneally, and orally. While intravenous application is the most used route of injection, the route is dependent on the mechanism of action and overall aim of the binding. Before application of the ligand, clinicians will perform imaging, generally via positron emission tomography (PET) or single-photon emission computed tomography (SPECT) for baseline comparison after radioligand administration. Once the radioligand is administered, the radioligand will travel to the target tissue and selectively bind. The structure of the compound allows clinicians to easily identify the path traveled and the destination via repeated imaging and the signal put out by the radiotracer attached to the ligand.

Direct radiotherapy performed via ionizing radiation can cause tissue damage and hypoxia to tissues other than the target. While this effect is lessened in a target radiotracer therapy utilizing radioligands, there is still an impact on the surrounding tissue described as Radiation Induced Bystander Effect (RIBE). Surrounding cells altered by the radioligand and displaying RIBE can show signs of stress, chromosomal abnormalities, or even experience cell death. However, the type of radiation used, whether 𝜶, β, or both can have a dramatically different effect on both the target binding site and surrounding tissue. Changes in nearby tissue is not the only possible impact of ligand therapy, there may be immunologic responses from the target tissue that cause changes remotely. This has been dubbed the "abscopal effect". While this mechanism is not well understood, it explains the impact of other tissue, both benign and malignant, after targeted radiotherapy.

== Use in imaging ==
Imaging is a useful tool in visualization of the radioligand after injection, with positron emission tomography (PET) and single-photon emission computed tomography (SPECT) being the most common types of imaging. PET scans are often utilized after radioligand administration because of the ease of use, image accuracy, and non-invasive nature. While PET and SPECT scans function similarly when imaging radioligands, the main difference lies in the type of radiation used, with PET scans utilizing positrons and SPECT utilizing gamma rays. When comparing the two modalities, PET offers much better image quality and high diagnostic proficiency, however, the high cost and the short half-lives of the positron-emitting isotopes limit their overall availability. Alternatively, SPECT imaging is more dynamic because of the lower cost burden and longer half-lives of single-photon emitters. With advances in technology came hybrid imaging that can combine PET, SPECT, computed tomography (CT), and magnetic resonance imaging (MRI). Some hybrid imaging modalities include: PET–CT, SPECT/CT, and PET/MRI. Although combined imaging presents both cost and availability barriers, the technology is an extremely useful diagnostic tool. Often, the patient does not have to be moved for both imaging types to be completed, and the clinicians are provided with rich, multi-dimensional imaging.

== Binding assays ==
Measuring the extent and kinetics of radioligand binding is important in determining information about binding sites of radioligands, and subsequent affinity to potential drugs. Three different binding assays are typically used for radioligand binding: saturation, competition, and kinetic binding.

=== Saturation binding ===
Saturation binding measures the specific binding of a radioligand at varying concentrations while at equilibrium. Through this method, the number of receptors can be determined as well as affinity of the ligand to these receptors. Saturation binding experiments are often called "Scatchard experiments" as they can be graphed as a Scatchard plot.

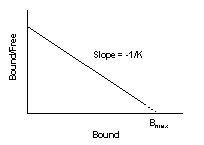
Depiction of a Scatchard plot with relation to number of binding sites, Bmax, and equilibrium dissociation constant Kd

=== Competition binding ===
Competitive binding experiments aim to determine the binding of a labeled radioligand at one specific concentration while subjected to various concentrations of a competitor, usually an unlabeled ligand. There are many purposes to competitive binding experiments, including being able to validate that the radioligand of interest will bind to the receptor with the expected affinity and potency even in the presence of a competitor. This experiment would also help determine if the radioligand will be able to recognize and bind to the correct receptor. Competitive binding experiments also serve to study the binding ability of a low-affinity drug, as it can be used as an unlabeled competitor. Receptor number and affinity can also be determined through this experiment.

=== Kinetic binding ===
Kinetic binding experiments differ from saturation and competition experiments in that they are not done at equilibrium. Instead, they measure the course of binding of the radioligand during the experiment as well as the dissociation to determine calculation of the Kd, and rate constants of binding and dissociation. Kinetic binding experiments are also called dissociation binding experiments and can help evaluate the interaction of the radioligand and the targeted receptor.

== Alpha and beta particles ==
𝜶 and β particles are both used in the treatment of cancers, depending on the size and location of the particular tumor. Alpha particles contain overall higher energy and have a shorter path length, and have greater cytotoxic properties for this reason as compared to β particles. However, due to the shorter path length of these particles, the method of delivery needs to be extremely close to the location of the tumor. Currently, treatments using alpha emitters exist which consist of alpha emitters attached to carrier molecules. Some examples of alpha-emitting radioligands include actinium-225, Ra-223-chloride, and Lead-212.36

Schematic illustrating the differences in path length and intensity of alpha, beta, gamma, and x-rays

β particles emit lower energy as compared to α-emitters, but they have the advantage of having longer path length. However, due to their lower energy, more β particles are required to cause damage to tumor cells as compared to α-emitters. Some examples of β-emitters are ^{177}Lu, ^{90}Y, and ^{131}I.

== Oncological applications ==
=== Lutathera for neuroendocrine tumors ===
Lutathera is a peptide receptor radioligand/radionuclide therapy (approved by the FDA in 2018) specifically for patients with gastroenteropancreatic neuroendocrine tumors (GEP-NETs) that express somatostatin hormone receptors (SSTR). The radioisotope is Lu-177 and the ligand is a SSTR on the surface of tumor cells.

Skeletal formula of Lu-177

^{177}Lu is produced by bombarding the stable isotope ^{176}Yb(which is found in monazite sand and the ores euxenite and xenotime) with neutrons. ^{176}Yb turns into ^{177}Yb which is unstable and has a half-life of 1.9 hours so it quickly decays into the medical isotope ^{177}Lu. For mass production, it is better to produce ^{176}Yb through fission reactors. This is the indirect production method and requires elaborate radiochemical separation, purification, and results in large amounts of radioactive waste. The direct method of producing ^{177}Lu is by performing neutron irradiation on ^{176}Lu to ^{177}Lu. This is an inexpensive and effective method to produce Lu-177. In the United States, the main place that ^{177}Lu is produced is the University of Missouri Research Reactor.

Once produced, Lu-177 is stable for 72 hours if stored below room temperature. Freeze dried kits of Lutathera do show reduced effectiveness in radiation therapy but they maintain radiochemical purity. Lu-177 requires radiation shielding for handling. Lu-177 is stored and transported in a vial with lead/plexiglass shielding ready-to-use. Repeated production, timely delivery, and quick administration are important so that the therapy remains effective.

Once transported to the hospital or cancer treatment / oncology center, the patient is prepped, all necessary tests are done, and the patient requires two separate IV sites for infusion. One site for radioactive Lu-177 infusion and one site for amino acid infusion. Amino acid infusion is needed to reduce radiation toxicity to the organs - specifically the kidneys. The sites are separate to prevent radioactive contamination after therapy. The patient receives therapy by automated syringe, infusion pump, or gravity using long/short needles, tubing, and sodium chloride solution. Antiemetic (anti-nausea) medications or short/long acting octreotide (cancer growth control) can be used post-therapy for symptom management.

The most common side effects include decreased blood cell counts, increased liver enzymes, vomiting, nausea, increased blood glucose, and decreased blood potassium levels. Lutathera is not given to pregnant or breastfeeding individuals. The therapy shrinks tumors by an average of 30%, reduces disease progression by 72%, and delays the growth of tumors.

=== Pluvicto and Xofigo for prostate cancer ===
Pluvicto also uses Lu-177 as the radioisotope (which is a beta emitter that decays to Hf-177) but its ligand is a prostate-specific membrane antigen (PSMA) targeted ligand as this radioligand therapy addresses metastatic prostate cancer. It was FDA approved in 2022. The difference between Lutathera and Pluvicto is shown in the chemical linkages in the images above. The production, transportation, and storage is the same as Lutathera. The therapy is administered intravenously through gravity, syringe, or a Peristaltic Infusion Pump. The major warnings include renal toxicity, infertility in males, and embryo/fetal harm. General side effects of this radioligand therapy include fatigue, nausea, dry mouth, anemia, decreased appetite, and constipation. Regular blood tests and imaging post-therapy are needed to see if the radioligand therapy is working and its side effects.

Chemical structure of Pluvicto

The benefits of Pluvicto include delaying tumor growth, extending life by about 20 months, and destroying tumor cells by damaging the DNA inside those cells.

Xofigo, a radioligand therapy that was FDA approved in 2013, uses radium-223 dichloride as the radioisotope, but its ligand varies from Pluvicto. Pluvicto only attacks cancer cells expressing PSMA, but Xofigo attacks all bone metastases. Qualified patients are 30% less likely to die when treated by Xofigo than if treated by a placebo. Ra-223-chloride is an alpha-emitting bone targeting agent.

=== Iodine-131 tositumomab (Bexxar) and Zevalin (90Y-ibritumomab tiuxetan) for non-Hodgkin's lymphoma ===
Bexxar, a radioligand therapy using the radioisotope I-131+Tositumomab (a murine monoclonal antibody) and binding/targeting the ligand CD20 on human B-cells. CD20 is a membrane spanning protein found on B-cell lymphocytes that is a tumor marker as it is in higher concentration in cancer patients — specifically leukemias or lymphomas (like non-hodgkin's lymphoma).

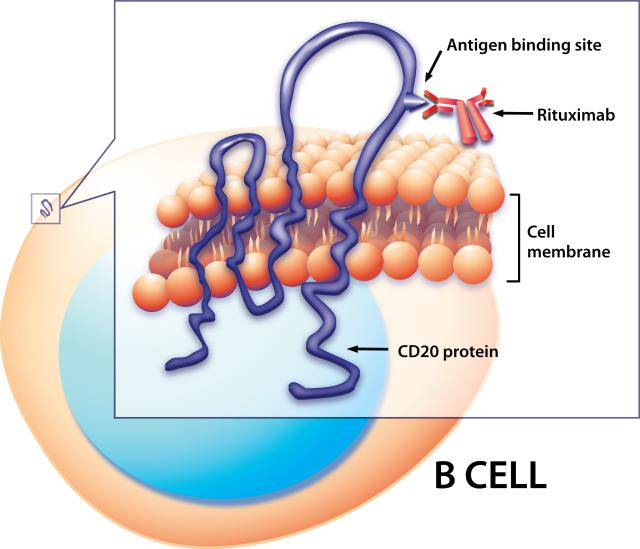
Example of monoclonal antibody (Rituximab) binding to CD20 on B-cell surface

^{131}I is produced by nuclear fission or through neutron irradiation of ^{130}Te to convert it to ^{131}Te which decays to ^{131}I (produced in the University of Missouri Research Reactor). I-131 is stored in lead-shielded vials.

24 hours before and 14 days after administration, thyroid protective drugs and KI tablets are administered. I-131 and Tositumomab are administered separately over the course of 14 days intravenously by dosimetric and therapeutic doses. Side effects include anemia, fever, rigors or chills, sweating, hypotension, dyspnea, bronchospasm, and nausea. There is a risk of radiation exposure to other individuals (women/children/fetus), anaphylaxis, neutropenia (low neutrophils), and thrombocytopenia (low platelet).

Zevalin, another radioligand therapy that targets non-Hodgkin lymphoma CD20 ligand but using Yttrium-90 as the radioisotope, was FDA approved in 2002.

== Requirements for administration ==
=== Patient eligibility ===
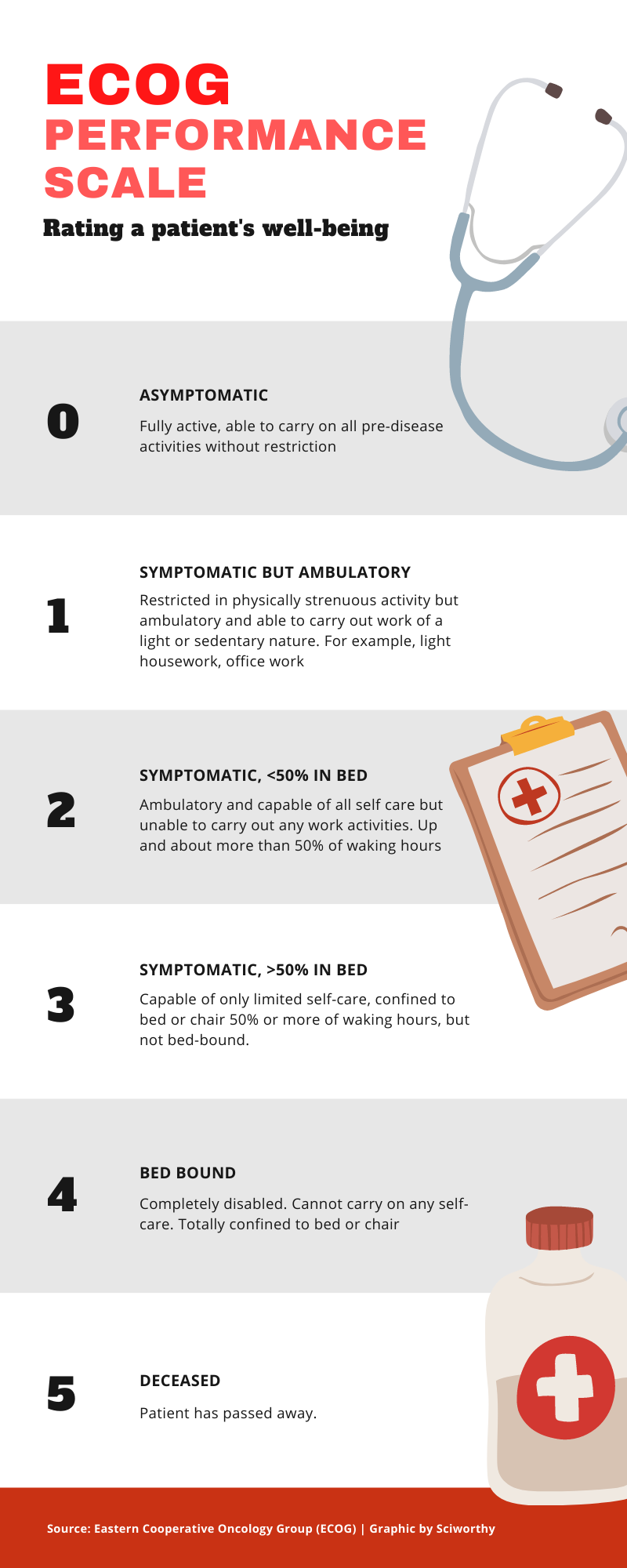
Depiction of ECOG performance scale ratings

Each radioligand therapy requires significant patient testing and eligibility requirements before administration. Radioligand therapies for cancer treatment are not the first course of action and generally require the patient to have undergone other previous treatments and many diagnostic imagings (i.e. seeing if specific receptors or antigens exist) to determine the benefit vs. adverse effect of undergoing the radioligand therapy.

For example, the PSMA radioligand therapy (Pluvicto) requires the patient to have end-stage prostate cancer that has metastasized in other organs, the PSMA ligand (confirmed through diagnostic imaging), and gone through hormonal therapies and chemotherapies. For patient eligibility to get Lutathera radioligand therapy the patient must have disease progression despite receiving somatostatin analog therapy (octreotide or lanreotide), have a locally advanced, inoperable, or metastatic well-differentiated disease, and have an Eastern Cooperative Oncology Group (ECOG) performance status of 0 to 2.

=== Hospital requirements and staff training ===
Since the patient group receiving radioligand therapy is narrow, many health care providers are not equipped or eligible to administer radioligand therapy. PET imaging machines, a lead-shielded area, and trained professionals must be available.

== Limitations ==
With radioligand therapy, there is always the risk of damage to non-cancerous surrounding tissues along with radioisotope toxicity which is always a challenge in determining how to administer and create the radioligand. Furthermore, the radioligand vial is only viable for a limited time and under specific conditions which challenges transport and storage along with feasible application to the patient.

Another limitation is the lack of centers that have trained personnel and equipment for radioligand therapy. Furthermore, individual characteristics affect the exact radiosensitivity to the therapy (thus affecting dosimetry) and are hard to predict without radiobiological models.

== Future potential applications ==
In the future, radioligand therapy may expand to include more α-emitter based treatments. Currently, β radioligand therapies are more commonly used in oncology. Clinical trials of α-emitters are underway due to their higher potency and ability to induce double-strand DNA breaks. There are multiple Actinium-225 based PSMA studies that will be launched in 2024. If these prove successful, there is potential for further studies and clinical trials to be done using α-emitters. There is potential for the future use of radioligand therapy in patients with malignant brain tumors. There have been recent developments in diagnostic tracers using radioligands, and with radioligand-based imaging techniques and in the field of theranostics.

== See also ==
- Binding potential
- PET radiotracer
- Radioactivity in the life sciences
- Volume of distribution
