= List of nuclear medicine societies =

This is a list of nuclear medicine societies worldwide, mentioned in Society of Nuclear Medicine and Molecular Imaging and/or in European Journal of Nuclear Medicine and Molecular Imaging.

- American Society of Nuclear Cardiology (ASNC)
- Armenian College of Nuclear Medicine (ACNM)
- Arab Society of Nuclear Medicine (ARSNM)
- Asia Oceania Federation of Nuclear Medicine and Biology (AOFNMB)
- Asian Regional Cooperative Council for Nuclear Medicine (ARCCNM)
- Asociación Latinoamericana de Sociedades de Biología y Medicina Nuclear (ALASBIMN)
- Associação Portuguesa de Técnicos de Medicina Nuclear (APTMN)
- Associazione Italiana di Medicina Nucleare
- Australian and New Zealand Association of Physicians in Nuclear Medicine (ANZAPNM)
- Australia-New Zealand Society of Nuclear Medicine (ANZSNM)
- Austrian Society of Nuclear Medicine
- Belgian Society of Nuclear Medicine (BELNUC)
- Bosnian Society of Nuclear Medicine
- Brazilian Society of Biology and Nuclear Medicine
- British Nuclear Medicine Society (BNMS)
- British Nuclear Cardiology Society (BNCS)
- Bulgarian Society of Nuclear Medicine
- Canadian Association of Nuclear Medicine (CANM)
- Chinese Society of Nuclear Medicine (CSNM)
- Colegio Internacional de Médicos Nucleares (ICNP) (Mexico)
- Croatian Society of Nuclear Medicine
- Cyprus Society of Nuclear Medicine
- Czech Society of Nuclear Medicine (ČSNM)
- Dansk Selskab For Klinisk Fysiologi og Nuklear Medicin
- Deutsche Gesellschaft für Nuklearmedizin
- Dutch Society of Nuclear Medicine (NVNG)
- Egyptian Society of Nuclear Medicine Specialists (ESNMS)
- Estonian Nuclear Medicine Society (ENMS)
- European Association of Nuclear Medicine (EANM)
- Federación Mexicana de Medicina Nuclear e Imagen Molecular (FMMNIM)
- Finnish Society of Nuclear Medicine (FSNM)
- French Society of Nuclear Medicine
- Hellenic Society of Nuclear Medicine
- Hellenic Society of Nuclear Medicine & Molecular Imaging
- Hong Kong Society of Nuclear Medicine
- Icelandic Society of Nuclear Medicine
- Iranian Society of Nuclear Medicine
- Irish Nuclear Medicine Association (INMA)
- Israeli Society of Nuclear Medicine (ISNM)
- Japan Society for Molecular Imaging
- Japanese Society of Nuclear Medicine
- Jordanian Society of Nuclear Medicine (JOSNM)
- Korean Society of Nuclear Medicine (KSNM)
- Kuwait Society of Nuclear Medicine and Molecular Imaging (KSNMMI)
- Latvian Association of Radiologist (LRA)
- Lithuanian Society of Nuclear Medicine
- Malaysian Society of Nuclear Medicine and Molecular Imaging (MSNMMI)
- National Society of Nuclear Medicine of the Republic of Kazakhstan
- Nigerian Association of Nuclear Medicine
- Norwegian Society of Nuclear Medicine and Molecular Imaging (NSNM)
- Nuclear Cardiological Society of India (NCSI)
- Nuclear Medicine Society of Tajikistan
- Pakistan Society of Nuclear Medicine (PSNM)
- Philippines National Society of Nuclear Medicine (PSNM)
- Polish Society of Nuclear Medicine
- Romanian Society of Nuclear Medicine (SRNM)
- Russian Society of Nuclear Medicine (RSNM)
- Serbian Nuclear Medicine Society (UNMS)
- Slovak Society of Nuclear Medicine and Radiation Hygiene (SSNM&RH)
- Sociedade Portugesa de Medicina Nuclear (SPMN)
- Society of Nuclear Medicine and Molecular Imaging (SNMMI)
- Society of Nuclear Medicine Bangladesh
- Society of Nuclear Medicine India
- South African Society of Nuclear Medicine
- Spanish Society of Nuclear Medicine (SEMN)
- Swedish Society of Nuclear Medicine
- Swiss Society of Nuclear Medicine (SSMN)
- Tunisian Society of Nuclear Medicine (STMN)
- Turkish Society of Nuclear Medicine
- Ukrainian Society of Nuclear Medicine (USNM)
- World Federation of Nuclear Medicine & Biology (WFNMB)
