= Journal of Nuclear Medicine Technology =

- Discipline: Nuclear medicine
- Language: English
- Edited by: Kathy Thomas

Publication details
- History: 1973-present
- Publisher: Society of Nuclear Medicine and Molecular Imaging
- Frequency: Quarterly

Standard abbreviations
- ISO 4: J. Nucl. Med. Technol.

Indexing
- CODEN: JNMTB4
- ISSN: 0091-4916 (print); 1535-5675 (web)
- LCCN: 73644442
- OCLC no.: 1787380

Links
- Journal homepage; Online access; Online archive

The Journal of Nuclear Medicine Technology is a quarterly peer-reviewed medical journal published by the Society of Nuclear Medicine and Molecular Imaging that focuses entirely on technology crucial to nuclear medicine, including quality assurance, radiation safety, and clinical applications of nuclear medicine. The journal was established in 1973 and the editor-in-chief is Kathy Thomas.
