= Angelika Bischof-Delaloye =

European scientist

Academic background
- Education: University of Innsbruck (MD)

Academic work
- Discipline: Physician
- Sub-discipline: Nuclear medicine
- Institutions: University of Lausanne; Lausanne University Hospital

Angelika Bischof-Delaloye is a former emeritus professor at the University of Lausanne in Lausanne, Switzerland.

== Career ==
From 1998 to 2009, Bischof-Delaloye was a full professor at the Nuclear Medicine Department at the University Lausanne, and the Department Head of Nuclear Medicine at Lausanne University Hospital.

She served on the European Board of Nuclear Medicine in 2006. In 2011, she wrote the editorial article for European Journal of Nuclear Medicine and Molecular Imaging (EJNMMI) to introduce the open-access journal called European Journal of Nuclear Medicine and Molecular Imaging Research (EJNMMI Res) in the area of basic, translational and clinical research in nuclear medicine. She currently serves as the editor-in-chief of the EJNMMI Res journal.

She obtained her MD degree from the University of Innsbruck, Austria in 1968. She published her first scientific paper in 1971 titled "Segmental, Sequential and Quantitative Pulmonary Investigations Using the Scintillation Camera" in the Journal of Nuclear Biology and Medicine. During her career, she published over 254 scientific manuscripts with more than 4713 citations, written many book chapters, and organised symposiums. She is also mentioned in the book History of Nuclear Medicine in Europe, which was published in 2003.

== Selected publications ==
- Elsinga, Philip; Delaloye, Angelika Bischof; Chiti, Arturo; Vandenberghe, Stefaan; Giammarile, Francesco; Carrio, Ignasi (16 April 2019). "Endorsement of International Consensus Radiochemistry Nomenclature Guidelines". EJNMMI Research. 9 (1): 34. doi:10.1186/s13550-018-0469-2. ISSN 2191-219X. PMC 6465378. PMID 30989393.
- Bischof Delaloye, Angelika (January 2011). "EJNMMI Research: a new journal in nuclear medicine" (PDF). European Journal of Nuclear Medicine and Molecular Imaging. 38 (1): 1–2. doi:10.1007/s00259-010-1673-0. ISSN 1619-7070. PMID 21104245.
- Beyer, Thomas; Flux, Glenn; Sattler, Bernhard; Bischof Delaloye, Angelika; Carrio, Ignasi (February 2014). "EJNMMI Physics—Access is open for open access". European Journal of Nuclear Medicine and Molecular Imaging. 41 (2): 197–198. doi:10.1007/s00259-013-2637-y. ISSN 1619-7070. PMID 24233128.
