= WMIS =

WMIS may refer to:

- WMIS (AM), a radio station (1240 AM) licensed to Natchez, Mississippi, United States
- WMIS-FM, a radio station (92.1 FM) licensed to Blackduck, Minnesota, United States
- World Molecular Imaging Society
