= Jason Lewis =

Jason Lewis may refer to:

- Jason Lewis (actor) (born 1971), American actor and former fashion model
- Jason Lewis (adventurer) (born 1967), self-powered English circumnavigator
- Jason Lewis (comedian) (born 1981), British actor, writer and comedian of Trinidadian descent
- Jason Lewis (Massachusetts politician) (born 1968), American state legislator in the Massachusetts Senate
- Jason Lewis (Minnesota politician) (born 1955), United States Representative representing Minnesota's 2nd district, 2020 Republican nominee for US Senate, former radio talk show host
- Jason Lewis (murderer) (born 1979), American murderer who murdered his parents in 1995
- Jason J. Lewis (born 1973), American voice actor
- Jason S. Lewis, British radiochemist
- Jason Lewis (born 1970), birth name of West Coast rapper AMG
- Jason Lewis (weight thrower), winner of the 2009 NCAA Division I Indoor Championships
- Jason Edward Lewis, artist and theorist

== See also ==
- Jay Lewis (disambiguation)
