= Jay Lewis =

Jay Lewis may refer to:

- Jay Lewis (director) (1914–1969), British film director and writer
- Jay Lewis (musician), former guitarist of The La's and current bassist of Cast
- Jay Lewis House, McGehee, Arkansas
- Jay Lewis (motorcyclist) in 2009 British 125 Championship season

== See also ==
- Matthew Jay Lewis, British actor
- Jason Lewis (disambiguation)
