= American Osteopathic Board of Nuclear Medicine =

US certification organization

- Abbreviation: AOBNM
- Formation: 1974
- Type: Professional
- Headquarters: Chicago, Illinois, IL
- Coordinates: 41.8942°N 87.6190°W
- Chairman: T. Bryan Struse, D.O.
- Vice Chairman: Michael Bend, D.O., Ph.D.
- Secretary-Treasurer: Paul Chase, D.O.
- Website: aobnm.org

The American Osteopathic Board of Nuclear Medicine (AOBNM) is an organization that provides board certification to qualified Doctors of Osteopathic Medicine (D.O.) who specialize in the use of radioactive substances in the diagnosis and treatment of disease (nuclear medicine physicians). The board is one 18 medical specialty certifying boards approved by the American Osteopathic Association Bureau of Osteopathic Specialists (AOABOS) of the American Osteopathic Association, and was established in 1974. As of December 2011, 32 osteopathic nuclear medicine physicians held active certification with the AOBNM.

== Board certification ==
Osteopathic nuclear medicine physicians are eligible for initial certification if they have completed an AOA-approved residency in nuclear medicine, have a current practice in nuclear medicine, an AOA membership that is in good standing, and an unrestricted medical license in the state in which their practice is located.

Diplomates certified in nuclear medicine before 1995 are eligible for voluntary recertification that expires after ten years. Since 1995, the American Osteopathic Board of Nuclear Medicine requires osteopathic nuclear medicine physicians to renew their certification every ten years to avoid expiration of their board-certified status.

== See also ==
- American Board of Nuclear Medicine
- American Osteopathic Association Bureau of Osteopathic Specialists
