= European Journal of Nuclear Medicine and Molecular Imaging =

Peer-reviewed medical journal

- Discipline: Nuclear Medicine
- Language: English
- Edited by: Arturo Chiti

Publication details
- History: 1976-present
- Publisher: Springer Science+Business Media
- Frequency: Monthly
- Impact factor: 9.236 (2020)

Standard abbreviations
- ISO 4: Eur. J. Nucl. Med. Mol. Imaging

Indexing
- CODEN: EJNMA6
- ISSN: 1619-7070 (print); 1619-7089 (web)
- LCCN: 2002252212
- OCLC no.: 49348061

Links
- Journal homepage

The European Journal of Nuclear Medicine and Molecular Imaging (EJNMMI) is a peer-reviewed medical journal published by Springer. It was the official journal of the European Association of Nuclear Medicine until December 2024. Since 1976, the EJNMMI has published material related to the field of nuclear medicine, including dosimetry, radiation biology, radiochemistry, radiopharmacology, molecular imaging probes, reporter gene assays, cell trafficking, targeting of endogenous gene expression, and antisense methodologies. As of 2021, the EJNMMI has an impact factor of 10.057.

== Spin off ==
In summer of 2011, Springer launched EJNMMI Research, a peer-reviewed open access journal, as a companion to the EJNMMI. It accommodates articles that could not be published in EJNMMI.
