= Vesna Sossi =

Canadian medical physicist

Vesna Sossi is a Canadian medical physicist at the University of British Columbia, where she is a professor in the Department of Physics and Astronomy and adjunct professor of medicine. Her research interests include theranostics and the use of positron emission tomography in the study of Parkinson's disease. She is president of the IEEE Nuclear & Plasma Sciences Society (NPSS), and a distinguished lecturer for NPSS.

== Education and career ==
Sossi studied high energy physics at the University of Trieste, earning a laurea (the Italian equivalent of a master's degree). She came to the University of British Columbia (UBC) for doctoral study in physics, completing her Ph.D. in 1991.

She has been an adjunct professor of medicine at UBC since 1997. After completing her doctorate, she continued at UBC as an assistant professor of physics from 2001 to 2004, associate professor from 2004 to 2009, and full professor since 2009.

== Recognition ==
Sossi was elected as an IEEE Fellow in 2023, "for contributions to quantitative and translational brain PET imaging".
