= Journal of Labelled Compounds and Radiopharmaceuticals =

Peer-reviewed scientific journal

- Discipline: Chemistry
- Language: English
- Edited by: R F Dannals and V Derdau

Publication details
- Former name: Journal of Labelled Compounds
- History: 1965–present
- Publisher: John Wiley & Sons
- Frequency: 14/year
- Impact factor: 1.921 (2020)

Standard abbreviations
- ISO 4: J. Label. Compd. Radiopharm.
- NLM: J Labelled Comp Radiopharm

Indexing
- CODEN: JLCRD4
- ISSN: 0362-4803 (print); 1099-1344 (web)
- LCCN: 76644079
- OCLC no.: 02339476

Links
- Journal homepage; Online access; Online archive

The Journal of Labelled Compounds and Radiopharmaceuticals is a peer-reviewed scientific journal that was established in 1965. It is published in fourteen issues per year by John Wiley & Sons on behalf of the International Isotope Society and covers all aspects of research and development leading to and resulting in labelled compound preparation. The current editor-in-chiefs are R F Dannals and V Derdau.

== Abstracting and indexing ==
The Journal of Labelled Compounds and Radiopharmaceuticals is abstracted and indexed in:

- Aquatic Sciences & Fisheries Abstracts
- Elsevier BIOBASE
- Biological Abstracts
- BIOSIS Previews
- Chemical Abstracts Service
- Chemistry Citation Index
- CSA Biological Sciences Database
- CSA Environmental Sciences & Pollution Management Database
- Current Contents/Life Sciences
- Current Contents/Physical, Chemical & Earth Sciences
- Embase
- PASCAL
- Science Citation Index
- Scopus
- VINITI

According to the Journal Citation Reports, the journal has a 2020 impact factor of 1.921, ranking it 50th out of 63 journals in the category "Chemistry Medicinal", 64th out of 87 journals in the category "Chemistry Analytical", and 63rd out of 78 journals in the category "Biochemical Research Methods".

== Most cited papers ==
According to the Web of Science, as of 2012, the following three papers have been cited most frequently (>80 times):

1. Ido, T.; Wan, C-N.; Casella, V.; Fowler, J. S.; Wolf, A. P.; Reivich, M.; Kuhl, D. E. (1978). "Labeled 2-deoxy-D-glucose analogs. 18F-labeled 2-deoxy-2-fluoro-D-glucose, 2-deoxy-2-fluoro-D-mannose and 14C-2-deoxy-2-fluoro-D-glucose". Journal of Labelled Compounds and Radiopharmaceuticals. 14 (2): 175. doi:10.1002/jlcr.2580140204.
2. Haka, Michael S.; Kilbourn, Michael R.; Leonard Watkins, G.; Toorongian, Steven A. (1989). "Aryltrimethylammonium trifluoromethanesulfonates as precursors to aryl \18F]fluorides: Improved synthesis of \18F]GBR-13119" (PDF). Journal of Labelled Compounds and Radiopharmaceuticals. 27 (7): 823. doi:10.1002/jlcr.2580270711. hdl:2027.42/90072.
3. Coenen, Heinrich Hubert; Schüller, Manfred; Stöcklin, Gerhard; Klatte, Bernd; Knöchel, Arndt (1986). "Preparation of N.C.A. \17-18F]-fluoroheptadecanoic acid in high yields via aminopolyether supported, nucleophilic fluorination". Journal of Labelled Compounds and Radiopharmaceuticals. 23 (5): 455. doi:10.1002/jlcr.2580230502.
