= Nuclear Medicine and Biology =

- Discipline: Nuclear medicine
- Language: English
- Edited by: William C. Eckelman

Publication details
- Former names: International Journal of Nuclear Medicine and Biology; International Journal of Radiation Applications and Instrumentation, Part B
- History: 1974-present
- Publisher: Elsevier
- Frequency: 8/year
- Impact factor: 2.408 (2013)

Standard abbreviations
- ISO 4: Nucl. Med. Biol.

Indexing
- ISSN: 0969-8051
- LCCN: 93648729
- OCLC no.: 644550135

Links
- Journal homepage; Online access; Online archive

Nuclear Medicine and Biology is a peer-reviewed medical journal published by Elsevier that covers research on all aspects of nuclear medicine, including radiopharmacology, radiopharmacy and clinical studies of targeted radiotracers. It is the official journal of the Society of Radiopharmaceutical Sciences. According to the Journal Citation Reports, the journal has a 2011 impact factor of 3.023.

== Abstracting and indexing ==
The journal is abstracted and indexed in:

- BIOSIS
- Elsevier BIOBASE
- Cambridge Scientific Abstracts
- Chemical Abstracts Service
- Current Contents/Life Sciences
- MEDLINE/PubMed
- EMBASE
