= Biodistribution =

Compound tracking method

Biodistribution is a method of tracking where compounds of interest travel in an experimental animal or human subject. For example, in the development of new compounds for PET (positron emission tomography) scanning, a radioactive isotope is chemically joined with a peptide (subunit of a protein). This particular class of isotopes emits positrons (which are antimatter particles, equal in mass to the electron, but with a positive charge). When ejected from the nucleus, positrons encounter an electron, and undergo annihilation which produces two gamma rays travelling in opposite directions. These gamma rays can be measured, and when compared to a standard, quantified.

== Biodistribution analysis ==
=== Purpose and results ===
A useful novel radiolabelled compound is one that is suitable either for medical imaging of certain body parts such as brain or tumors (injecting low doses of radioactivity) or for treating tumors (requiring injection of high doses of radioactivity). In both cases, the compound needs to accumulate in the target organ and any surplus compound present needs to clear the body rapidly. In medical diagnostic imaging, this then produces a clear diagnostic image (high image contrast), and in radiotherapy leads to an attack of the target (e.g. tumor) while minimizing side effects to non-target organs. Additional factors need to be evaluated in the development of a new diagnostic or therapeutic compound, including safety for humans. From an efficacy point of view, the biodistribution is an important aspect which can be measured by dissection or by imaging.

=== By dissection ===
For example, a new radiolabelled compound is injected intravenously into a group of 16-20 rodents (typically mice or rats). At intervals of 1, 2, 4, and 24 hours, smaller groups (4-5) of the animals are euthanized, then dissected. The organs of interest (usually: blood, liver, spleen, kidney, muscle, fat, adrenals, pancreas, brain, bone, stomach, small intestine, and upper and lower large intestine, a tumor if present) are placed in pre-weighed containers and weighed, then placed into a device that measures radioactivity (e.g. gamma radiation). Normalizing the tissue radioactivity concentrations to the injected dose gives values in units of percent of the injected dose per gram of organ or biological tissue. The results give a dynamic view of how the compound moves through the animal and where it is retained.

=== By imaging ===
Similar to the dissection procedure, animals are injected with a low dose of a radiolabelled compound. At the chosen time points after injection, PET or SPECT images are acquired, typically also a CT or MR image for anatomical reference. The radioactivity concentration is measured from the PET or SPECT images for the various organs of interest. This may include measuring the volume of these organs e.g. from the CT image (rather than weighing the organs as in the dissection procedure) or assessing the radioactivity concentration in a representative part of the organ. Normalizing the tissue radioactivity concentrations to the injected dose gives values in units of percent of the injected dose per milliliter of organ or biological tissue.

A benefit of imaging is that the animals can be anaesthetized for imaging for several or all the required time points, that is few animals are required for this procedure and all of them are kept alive. This is considered a non-invasive procedure. In addition, the procedure is in essence the same as for medical diagnostic imaging in the clinic with two main differences: (1) novel compounds under development may be injected into animals subject to scrutiny and approval of the detailed experimental plan while clinicians can only inject radiolabelled compounds that had been tested rigorously and approved for use in humans; (2) animals usually need to be anaesthetized for the duration of the scan (on the order of minutes) while humans are awake and simply need to stay still during the scan.

== Non-invasive biodistribution imaging in gene therapy ==
In gene therapy, gene delivery vectors, such as viruses, can be imaged according either to their particle biodistribution or their transduction pattern. The former means labeling the viruses with a contrast agent, being visible in some imaging modality, such as MRI or SPECT/PET and latter means visualising the marker gene of gene delivery vector to be visible by the means of immunohistochemical methods, optical imaging or even by PCR. Non-invasive imaging has gained popularity as the imaging equipment has become available for research use from clinics.

For example, avidin-displaying baculoviruses could be imaged in rat brain by coating them with biotinylated iron particles, rendering them visible in MR imaging. The biodistribution of the iron-virus particles was seen to concentrate on the choroid plexus cells of lateral ventricles.
