= American Board of Nuclear Medicine =

- Founded: July 28, 1971; 54 years ago
- Tax ID no.: 13-2690306
- Legal status: 501(c)(3) nonprofit organization
- Headquarters: St. Louis, Missouri
- Chair: Joanna Fair, M.D., Ph.D.
- Executive Director: George Segall, M.D.
- Revenue: $1,098,897 (2015)
- Expenses: $925,158 (2015)
- Website: www.abnm.org

The American Board of Nuclear Medicine (ABNM) certifies physicians as specialists in the practice of nuclear medicine. Diplomates of the ABNM are called nuclear medicine physicians. The ABNM is one of the 24 member boards of the American Board of Medical Specialties (ABMS).

Nuclear medicine procedures use the tracer principle, most often radioactive tracers called radiopharmaceuticals, to evaluate molecular, metabolic, physiologic, and pathologic conditions for diagnosis, therapy, and research. Nuclear medicine procedures are the major clinical applications of molecular imaging and molecular therapy.

== Mission statement ==
The American Board of Nuclear Medicine is the primary certifying organization for nuclear medicine in the United States. The Board serves the public through assurance of high quality patient care by establishing standards of training, initial certification, and continuing competence of physicians providing nuclear medicine diagnostic and therapeutic services.

== History ==
- The American Board of Nuclear Medicine
  - In 1971, the ABNM was founded as a conjoint board, sponsored by
    - the American Board of Internal Medicine,
    - the American Board of Pathology,
    - the American Board of Radiology, and
    - the Society of Nuclear Medicine and Molecular Imaging, formerly the Society of Nuclear Medicine.
  - In 1985, it became a primary board, and
  - in 1990, it became an independent board.
- Certification
  - In 1972, the ABNM issued its first certificates.
  - In 1992, recertification every 10 years was introduced.
  - In 2007, recertification was replaced by the ongoing process called maintenance of certification
  - In 2017, a pilot of CertLink™ will be provided as an alternate to the MOC exam.

== Certification ==
A physician certified by the American Board of Nuclear Medicine has

1. a valid license to practice medicine,
2. successfully completed training in an Accreditation Council for Graduate Medical Education (ACGME) approved residency program,
3. been evaluated by the director of the training program and found competent in clinical nuclear medicine, and
4. passed a secure computer-based examination encompassing the medical uses of radioactive materials and related sciences.

The American Board of Medical Specialties has a free website where certification of physicians can be confirmed, and where certified physicians can be found by geographic location.

== Maintenance of certification ==
Maintenance of Certification (MOC) is a program of continuing education and evaluation for the diplomates of all member boards of the American Board of Medical Specialties. Initial certification documents a physicians initial competence; Maintenance of Certification documents a commitment to remaining up-to-date. The American Board of Nuclear Medicine's MOC program has four parts.

1. Professional standing. Evidence of professional standing is provided by maintain unrestricted license(s) to practice medicine.
2. Lifelong learning and self-assessment. Diplomates must document participation in continuing medical education and must take part in self-assessment activities that are qualified by the ABNM.
3. Cognitive expertise. Either a secure, reliable, and valid exam must be successfully passed each 10 years, or diplomates must participate in CertLink.
4. Performance in practice evaluation. A continuing process of evaluation, improvement, and reevaluation must be applied by each diplomates to his/her own practice.

== CertLink™ ==
The CertLink pilot will provide ABNM diplomates with questions to answer on a regular basis. After answering the question, the diplomates will receive feedback – the correct answer, a brief explanation, and literature references. The pilot has been designed using cognitive physiology principles to provide continuing medical education at the same time as the diplomate demonstrates continuing expertise.

== Components of professional competence ==
Nuclear medicine is a technology embedded medical specialty depending upon

- physics (Medical physics) to understand radioisotopes and radiation,
- engineering to design instruments that can image and measure gamma rays and X-rays,
- radiation biology and health physics to understand therapy and radiation protection,
- chemistry and pharmacy to produce radiopharmaceuticals, and
- biochemistry and physiology to understand the biodistribution of tracers.

The components of professional competence for nuclear medicine physicians include a basic understanding of all of these underlying sciences as well as a thorough understanding of their medical application. The program requirements for nuclear medicine residencies also include all of these elements.

== Related organizations ==
The American Board of Nuclear Medicine certifies individual nuclear medicine physicians. The nuclear medicine review committee of the Accreditation Council for Graduate Medical Education (ACGME) certifies nuclear medicine residency training programs. The Society of Nuclear Medicine and Molecular Imaging (SNMMI), the major nuclear medicine scientific and professional organization, provides continuing education and self-assessment modules that can be used to fulfill the lifelong learning and self-assessment requirement of MOC, and the SNMMI is developing material for performance in practice evaluation. Additionally, the American Osteopathic Board of Nuclear Medicine is responsible for certification of osteopathic nuclear medicine physicians.

The American College of Nuclear Physicians (ACNP) represents the practice and socio-economic interests of those engaged in the use of radionuclides.

A closely related board, the American Board of Radiology is another member of the American Board of Medical Specialties. The ABR certifies radiologists who also practice nuclear medicine.

The Nuclear Regulatory Commission (NRC) or associated state regulatory agencies oversee radiation safety associated with radioactive, by-product material. The U.S. Food and Drug Administration (FDA) oversees the radiopharmaceuticals used by nuclear medicine.

== See also ==
- American Board of Medical Specialties
- American Osteopathic Board of Nuclear Medicine
