= Molecular Imaging and Biology =

- Discipline: Diagnostic imaging, Molecular biology
- Language: English
- Edited by: Jason S. Lewis, PhD

Publication details
- Former name: Clinical Positron Imaging
- History: 1999-present
- Publisher: Springer Science+Business Media
- Frequency: Bimonthly
- Impact factor: 3.341 (2018)

Standard abbreviations
- ISO 4: Mol. Imaging Biol.

Indexing
- ISSN: 1536-1632 (print); 1860-2002 (web)
- LCCN: 2001215378
- OCLC no.: 47441501

Links
- Journal homepage; Online access

Molecular Imaging and Biology is published by Springer Science+Business Media as the official journal of the World Molecular Imaging Society (WMIS) in collaboration with the European Society for Molecular Imaging (ESMI). It publishes original research contributions on the utilization of molecular imaging in problems of relevance to biology and medicine.

According to the Journal Citation Reports, the journal has a 2018 impact factor of 3.341.
