= Maintenance of certification =

Physician certification in the United States

Maintenance of certification (MOC) is a process of physician certification maintenance through one of the 24 approved medical specialty boards of the American Board of Medical Specialties (ABMS) and the 18 approved medical specialty boards of the American Osteopathic Association (AOA). Variously implemented between 1990 and 2000 in response to quality concerns in the healthcare system, the MOC process is a voluntary certification process and is controversial within the medical community. The ideal behind it is that physicians formally measure and demonstrate that they are doing adequate continuing medical education to stay current in their fields as the state of the art in each field continually advances beyond what it was when each person was initially educated and trained. Some physicians disagree that the programs as implemented in reality uphold this ideal well enough to be a net positive to the profession rather than a net negative.

Starting with Oklahoma in 2016, a growing number of states have passed or are considering passage of legislation prohibiting use of participation in Maintenance of Certification as a reason to exclude a physician from hospital staff appointment or from insurance company physician panels.

== Medical community ==
Some major medical organizations gain profit from and have expressed support for the Maintenance of Certification program including the following:

- American Board of Medical Specialties (ABMS)
- American Osteopathic Association (AOA)
- American Medical Association (AMA)
- American Hospital Association (AHA)
- National Board of Medical Examiners (NBME)
- Federation of State Medical Boards (FSMB)
- Council of Medical Specialty Societies (CMSS)
- Accreditation Council for Graduate Medical Education (ACGME)
- Association of American Medical Colleges (AAMC)
- Educational Commission for Foreign Medical Graduates (ECFMG)

Some major medical organizations do not gain profit from and do not support the Maintenance of Certification program, including the following:

- Association of American Physicians and Surgeons (AAPS)
- National Board of Physicians and Surgeons (NBPAS)
- Docs 4 Patient Care Foundation (D4PC)
- Physicians for Certification Change
- Independent Physicians for Patient Independence (IP4PI)

== Competencies ==
The ABMS Program for MOC involves ongoing measurement of six core competencies defined by ABMS and ACGME:

- Practice-based Learning and Improvement
- Patient Care and Procedural Skills
- Systems-based Practice
- Medical Knowledge
- Interpersonal and Communication Skills
- Professionalism

These competencies, which are the same ones used in the ACGME's Next Accreditation System, are measured in the ABMS Program for MOC within a four-part framework:

- Part I: Professionalism and Professional Standing
- Part II: Lifelong Learning and Self-Assessment
- Part III: Assessment of Knowledge, Judgment, and Skills
- Part IV: Improvement in Medical Practice

== Studies and criticism ==
Some health plans are implementing programs that recognize and reward physicians who are actively participating in Maintenance of Certification activities. ABMS member boards are actively working with other health care organizations to advance quality initiatives and reduce measurement redundancy through recognition of physicians' Maintenance of Certification program participation. A growing number of hospitals and health systems are beginning to use Maintenance of Certification components to engage physicians in quality improvement. Many hospitals are now endorsing and accepting certification from the National Board of Physicians and Surgeons (NBPAS) instead of ABMS board certification.

Studies suggest that board-certified physicians provide improved quality of patient care and better clinical outcomes than those physicians without board certification, including a 15% reduction in mortality rate among heart attack patients treated by board-certified physicians. Considering a recent meta-analysis that shows a decline in physician performance associated with the time elapsed since the physician's initial training, it is essential for physicians to participate in programs such as Maintenance of Certification in order to keep current with medicine's expanding knowledge base and technical advances, and to apply this knowledge to quality improvement in their medical practice. There is, however, no evidence MOC participation has any effect on this alleged age-related decline in performance and no evidence MOC is as good as any other intervention or no intervention. Maintenance of Certification strives to help physicians and other health care stakeholders address the critical need to enhance patient safety and patient care quality. There is no evidence to support any efficacy for maintenance of certification in enhancing patient safety and patient care quality. It is important to recognize the extensive conflicts of interests in studies funded by and performed by ABMS and specialty board employees.

Studies have shown that a physician's ability to independently and accurately self-assess is poor, that more clinical experience does not necessarily lead to better outcomes of care and that fewer than 30% of physicians examine their own performance data and try to improve. The MOC program structure strives to address these concerns with a sound theoretical rationale via the six ACGME competencies framework and a respectable body of scientific evidence, and to address its relationship to patient outcomes, physician performance, validity of the assessment or educational methods utilized and learning or improvement potential. A study presented at the AcademyHealth conference in June 2013 found a correlation between an MOC requirement and reduced cost of care and emergency department visits; this paper is currently under review. There are no data suggesting MOC is in any way superior to a number of self-assessment programs, sponsored by physician specialty societies, that are significantly less expensive than MOC.

== See also ==
- American Board of Medical Specialties (ABMS)
- American Osteopathic Association Bureau of Osteopathic Specialists (AOABOS)
