= The Journal of Nuclear Medicine =

- Discipline: Nuclear medicine
- Language: English
- Edited by: Johannes Czernin

Publication details
- History: 1964-present
- Publisher: Society of Nuclear Medicine and Molecular Imaging
- Frequency: Monthly
- Impact factor: 10.057 (2020)

Standard abbreviations
- ISO 4: J. Nucl. Med.

Indexing
- CODEN: JNMEAQ
- ISSN: 0161-5505 (print); 2159-662X (web)
- OCLC no.: 807503641

Links
- Journal homepage; Online access; Online archive

The Journal of Nuclear Medicine is a monthly peer-reviewed medical journal published by Society of Nuclear Medicine and Molecular Imaging that covers research on all aspects of nuclear medicine, including molecular imaging.

== Abstracting and indexing ==
The journal is abstracted and indexed in Science Citation Index, Current Contents/Clinical Medicine, Current Contents/Life Sciences, BIOSIS Previews, and MEDLINE/PubMed. According to the Journal Citation Reports, the journal has a 2020 impact factor of 10.057, ranking it 3rd out of 134 journals in the category "Radiology, Nuclear Medicine & Medical Imaging".
