= Society of Nuclear Medicine and Molecular Imaging =

- SNMMI Headquarters
- Formation: 1954
- Type: Professional association
- Headquarters: 1850 Samuel Morse Drive, Reston, VA 20190
- Members: 19,000
- Key people: Virginia Pappas, CAE, CEO
- Budget: $10.8 million
- Staff: 50
- Website: www.snmmi.org

The Society of Nuclear Medicine and Molecular Imaging (SNMMI), formerly the Society of Nuclear Medicine, is a nonprofit scientific and professional organization that promotes the science, technology and practical application of nuclear medicine and molecular imaging. SNMMI's mission is to improve human health by advancing molecular imaging and therapy.

The SNMMI was founded in 1954 as the Society of Nuclear Medicine, under the sponsorship of the Pacific Northwest Society of Nuclear Medicine. The name was changed to include molecular imaging in 2012. SNMMI has 15,000 members, consisting of nuclear and molecular imaging professionals worldwide. Members include physicians, technologists, physicists, pharmacists, scientists, laboratory professionals and more.

The SNMMI national headquarters is located in Reston, Virginia, and 12 state/regional chapters are located throughout the United States and Canada. As a volunteer organization, SNMMI is governed by a policy-making board of directors, a house of delegates, committees and councils.

== Publications ==
SNMMI's flagship journal, The Journal of Nuclear Medicine, ranked seventh in its category in 2020 according to its CiteScore. The Journal of Nuclear Medicine Technology focuses specifically on issues of interest to technologists. In addition, SNMMI publishes a number of books, newsletters and other products of interest to its members.

== Education and research ==
SNMMI's Annual Meeting and Mid-Winter Meeting provide the nuclear and molecular imaging community with education programs on the latest advances in the field. SNMMI also offers Maintenance of Certification courses as well as live and online learning opportunities through its Learning Center.

SNMMI provides a forum in which researchers and physicians can communicate and collaborate to speed the process of evaluating scientific and clinical research and integrating it into clinical practice.

== Advocacy ==
On behalf of its members, SNMMI advocates for improved policies and legislation for research, funding and reimbursement for molecular imaging. SNMMI also works with its members to develop practice guidelines and accreditation standards.

== Outreach ==
SNMMI is involved in educating patients and referring physicians about nuclear medicine and molecular imaging. A Patient Advocacy Advisory Board was created to guide the society's outreach efforts. The board includes the Alzheimer's Association, the American Thyroid Association, the Leukemia and Lymphoma Society, the Ovarian Cancer National Alliance, the American Heart Association, the Men's Health Network, NorCal CarciNET Community and the Thyroid Cancer Survivors' Association. One of the main projects of the board was the development of a patient-oriented website, DiscoverMI.org.

== See also ==
- American Board of Nuclear Medicine
- American Board of Science in Nuclear Medicine
- Nuclear medicine physician
