= Lung counter =

Medical device for measuring radiation exposure

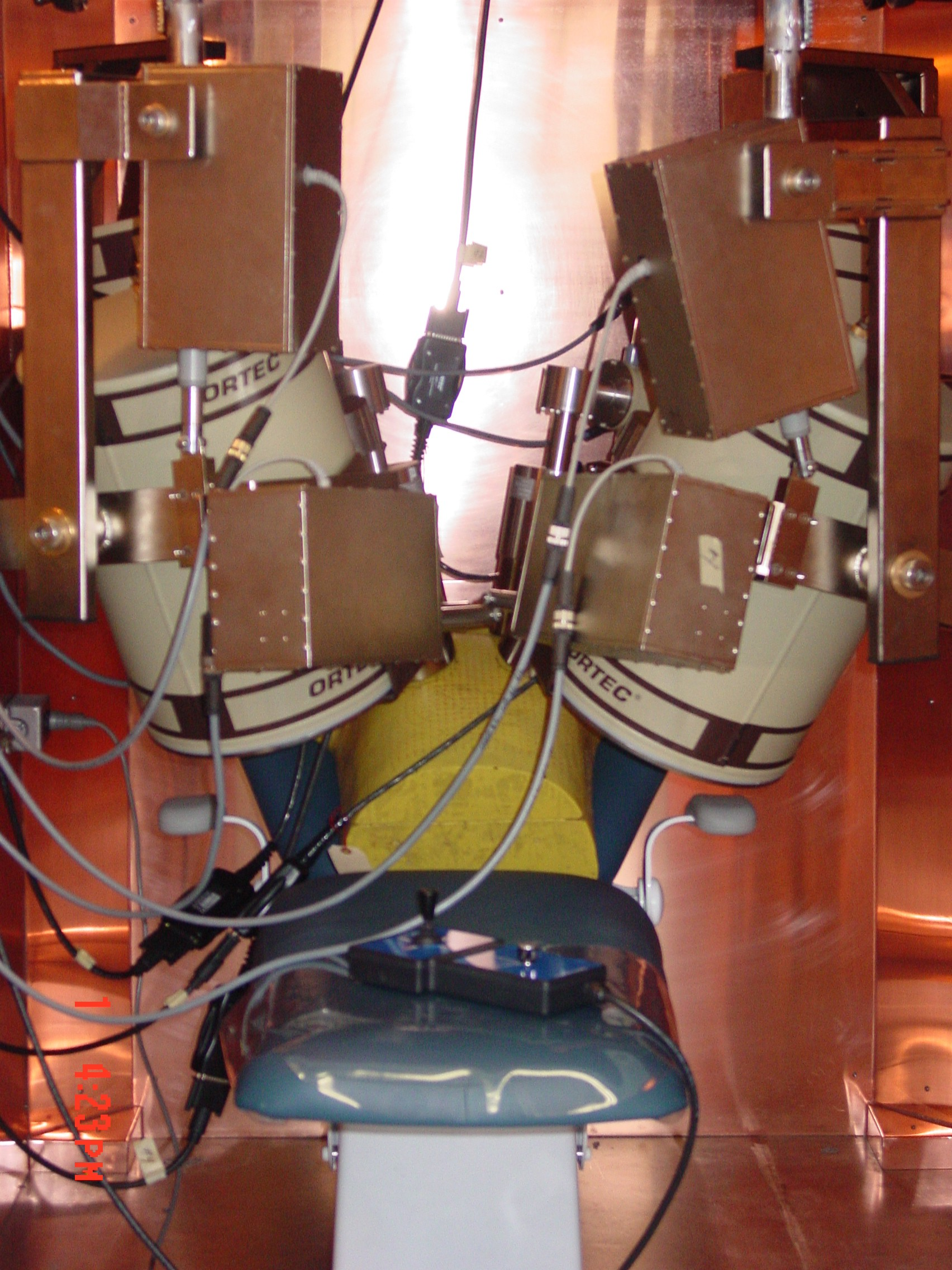
A lung counter

A lung counter is a system consisting of a radiation detector, or detectors, and associated electronics that is used to measure radiation emitted from radioactive material that has been inhaled by a person and is sufficiently insoluble as to remain in the lung for weeks, months, or years. They are frequently used in occupations where workers may be exposed to radiation.

The lung counter may be placed on or near the body. These systems are also often housed in a low background counting chamber. Such a chamber may have thick walls made of low-background steel (~20–25 cm thick) and lined with lead, cadmium, tin, or polypropylene, with a final layer of copper. The purpose of the lead, cadmium (or tin), and copper is to reduce the background in the low energy region of a gamma spectrum (typically less than 200 keV).

== Calibration ==
As a lung counter is primarily measuring radioactive materials that emit low energy gamma rays or x-rays, the phantom used to calibrate the system must be anthropometric. An example of such a phantom is the Lawrence Livermore National Laboratory Torso Phantom.

== See also ==
- Bomab
