= Foundation for Research on Information Technologies in Society =

Independent research foundation

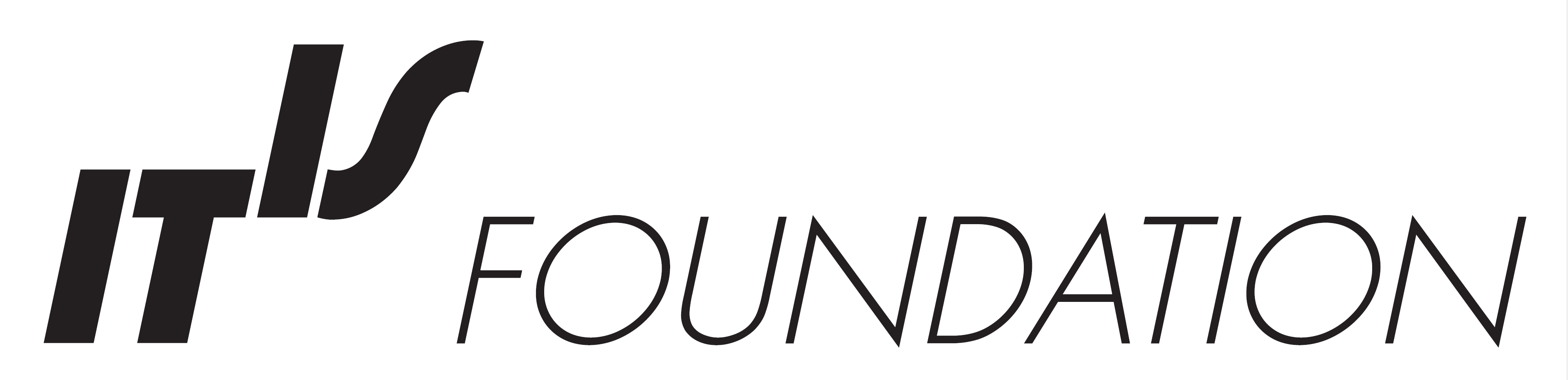
- Type: Nonprofit scientific research institute
- Industry: Research and development
- Founded: Zurich, Switzerland (1999; 27 years ago)
- Founder: Niels Kuster Thomas Schmid
- Headquarters: Zeughausstrasse 43; Zurich, Switzerland
- Area served: Worldwide
- Key people: Niels Kuster (Director); Myles Capstick (Associate Director Experimental Electromagnetics); Esra Neufeld (Associate Director Computational Life Sciences)
- Number of employees: 52 (as of April 2025)
- Website: www.itis.swiss

The Foundation for Research on Information Technologies in Society (IT'IS) is a nonprofit scientific research institute in Zurich, Switzerland, established in 1999.

IT'IS has links to the Swiss Federal Institute of Technology in Zurich (ETH Zurich) and the global wireless communications industry (e.g., the Mobile Manufacturers Forum (MMF) and GSMA), and has received research support from Swiss, European, and U.S. funding agencies.

IT'IS participates in working groups of international standards organizations such as the Institute of Electrical and Electronics Engineers (IEEE), the International Electrotechnical Commission (IEC), and the Cellular Telephone Industries Association (CTIA), contributes to the formulation of safety standards for wireless industries, and advises regulatory agencies regarding the biological effects of electromagnetic (EM) energy.

Researchers at the IT'IS Foundation use computational life sciences to study applications of EM energy in wireless information technologies and medicine. IT'IS develops tools and methods used by medical-technical industries and manufacturers of wireless devices to assess the absorption of EM fields by living tissue.

IT'IS employs 52 people and shares facilities in Zurich with other members of the Zurich43 (Z43) alliance, which includes the commercial R&D units Schmidt & Partner Engineering AG (SPEAG), Zurich MedTech AG (ZMT), and TI Solutions AG.

== History ==
The IT'IS Foundation was established on November 22, 1999, with the mission to engineer accurate EM measurement methods and to provide science-based regulatory advice regarding interactions of EM fields with living tissues. The first foundation board consisted of ETH Zurich professors Ralf Hütter, Albert Kündig, Wolfgang Fichtner, and Niels Kuster, as well as Alexander Borbély (University of Zurich, CH), Masao Taki (Tokyo Metropolitan University, JP), Mirjana Moser (Swiss Federal Office of Public Health, CH), Quirino Balzano (Motorola Inc., USA), Michael Burkhart (Sunrise Communication AG, CH), Michael Milligan (Mobile Manufacturers Forum, BE), and Christophe Grangeat (Alcatel, FR).

=== 2000−2009 ===
During the first decade, IT'IS researchers focused on creating the scientific knowledge base and tools to assess potential health hazards of exposure to EM fields, developing experimental and computational methods, as well as instrumentation and procedures to reliably assess the specific absorption rate (SAR) of EM fields induced in humans associated with the use of wireless communication devices. IT'IS researchers have worked with engineering partner SPEAG and international research organizations to develop and fabricate exposure systems as well as dosimetry and quality assurance (QA) methods, and have collaborated on national and international research programs to investigate potential adverse biological effects of EM field exposure. The exposure setups used in the National Toxicology Program (NTP) study funded by the U.S. National Institute of Environmental Health Sciences (NIEHS) on the carcinogenicity due to exposure to the EM radiation emitted by mobile phone signals were designed and fabricated by the IT'IS Foundation. IT'IS collaborated with the sleep laboratory of the Institute of Pharmacology and Toxicology of the University of Zurich on how radiofrequency (RF) exposure affects the sleep and the awake electroencephalogram (EEG). IT'IS worked with the U.S. Food & Drug Administration (FDA) to develop a group of anatomically detailed 3D human computational phantoms — the Virtual Family models, consisting of an adult male, adult female, and two children — based on high-resolution magnetic resonance imaging (MRI) data of healthy volunteers.

In 2006, the commercial firm ZMT Zurich MedTech was founded as a spin-off of the IT'IS Foundation.

=== 2010−2019 ===
In 2010, the IT'IS Foundation was featured in Technoscope, the "technical magazine for youth and the youthful" of The Swiss Academy of Engineering Sciences (SATW), an independent organization for the promotion of the engineering sciences. A 2010 IT'IS publication on human exposure to EM fields from energy saving light bulbs was part of a report on the safety of fluorescent bulbs aired by the Canadian investigative newsmagazine television program 16:9 The Bigger Picture.

The IT'IS Foundation added a group of child anatomical computational phantoms, called the Virtual Classroom, to the Virtual Family in 2010. The library of computational phantoms was extended by the addition of Glenn (an elderly male model) and Fats (an obese male model) and was renamed the Virtual Population (ViP). The FDA and IT'IS developed a multimodal imaging-based detailed anatomical (MIDA) model of the human head and neck, which includes representations of eyes, ears, and deep brain structures, as well as several muscles, bones and skull layers, arteries and veins, cranial nerves, and salivary glands. The models are freely available for use in non-commercial projects by research groups around the world.

IT'IS uses computational physics in precision medicine applications, and was funded in 2010 by Commission for Technology and Innovation (CTI; now Innosuisse) to develop the Sim4Life computational platform, which was later commercialized by partner ZMT. The project Sim4Life CAPITALIS was funded in 2013 and was nominated for the CTI Swiss Medtech Award in 2015.

IT'IS co-organized the 2015 meeting of the European Society for Hyperthermic Oncology (ESHO2015) on hyperthermia research. The IT'IS Foundation – together with the Competence Center for Personalized Medicine in Zurich – organized the Latsis Foundation Symposium in 2016, with the title "Personalized Medicine: Challenges and Opportunities" and with additional funding from the Swiss National Science Foundation.

In 2017, the IT'IS Foundation was selected by the U.S. National Institutes of Health (NIH) to develop the online simulation platform o^{2}S^{2}PARC – Open Online Simulations for Stimulating Peripheral Activity to Relieve Conditions, a project funded through the NIH Common Fund's SPARC program to establish a Modeling and Simulation (SIM-) Core within the SPARC Data and Resource Center.

The NTP study on the risks of exposure to wireless devices published in 2018 was carried out with exposure systems designed, produced, and maintained by IT'IS, and IT'IS representatives participated in the peer review of the resulting technical reports. IT'IS investigations on 5G exposure have contributed to the development of novel measurement instrumentation and phase reconstruction algorithms to analyze the power density in the very close near-field of transmitters. IT'IS Foundation research on exposure to 5G wireless devices and the absorption of millimeter-waves by the skin and the resulting temperature increase draws attention to potential hazards.

IT'IS also performs research in the area of MRI technology to analyze the risks of RF exposure, especially in the context of medical implant safety. In 2017, the researchers of IT'IS, together with their colleagues at the Massachusetts Institute of Technology (MIT), Harvard Medical School, and Imperial College London, established the concept of deep brain stimulations with temporal interference (TI). The spin-off company, TI Solutions AG, was founded in 2019 to support TI research through development of flexible TI stimulation devices and corresponding planning tools as well as to advance the translation of this research into clinical therapies.

=== 2020− ===
With NIH funding, IT'IS continues to develop the o^{2}S^{2}PARC platform as part of the SPARC Portal. The computational modeling pipeline developed by IT'IS was used in a clinical study to apply spinal cord neuromodulation to restore trunk and leg motor function in patients after complete paralysis. IT'IS researchers developed new hardware concepts for precise TI stimulation, EEG and MRI filters for closed-loop TI protocols in experimental and clinical studies, and the Temporal Interference Planning (TIP) tool, which is used for optimized electrode placement for targeted TI stimulation. TI stimulation has been applied in a series of studies performed in collaboration with the Institut de Neurosciences des Systèmes, Marseille (INSERM) and the Imperial College London, the École Polytechnique Fédérale de Lausanne (EPFL), and the UK Dementia Research Institute.

In 2022, the IT'IS Foundation established the Katja Poković Research Fund (KPRF) to honor the memory of Katja Poković, PhD (1968–2021), who had been the Director of Laboratory and Customer Services of SPEAG from 1999 to 2021. The KPRF offers research fellowships specifically for female applicants as well as funding support for research projects internal to the IT'IS Foundation.

== Major projects ==
Seed funding for the IT'IS Foundation was provided in part by SPEAG and the MMF; SPEAG and ZMT remain reliable sources of funding. Other major funding has been obtained through competitive applications to Swiss (CH), European Union (EU), and international funding instruments. Selected major research projects are listed below.

Project name	Source	Funding Instrument	Award Year
PERFORM A	EU	5th Framework (FP5)	2000
REFLEX	EU	FP5	2000
PERFORM B	International	MMF and GSMA	2000
PERFORM C	International	MMF and GSMA	2004
NRP57	CH	Swiss National Science Foundation (SNSF)	2006
HYCUNEHT	CH	CTI	2006
VT/2007/017	EU	EU Commission, Employment, Social Affairs & Inclusion	2007
MRI+	CH	CTI / EUREKA	2008
SEAWIND	EU	7th Framework (FP7)	2009
Sim4Life	CH	CTI	2010
S4L-Capitalis	CH	CTI	2011
ARIMMORA	EU	FP7	2011
GERoNiMO	EU	FP7	2014
RESTORE	CH/EU	Eurostars	2017
o^{2}S^{2}PARC	USA	NIH SPARC	2017
NEUROMAN	CH	Innosuisse	2017
NeuHeart	EU	HORIZON 2020	2018
PREP2GO	CH/EU	Eurostars	2020
OptiStim	CH/EU	Eurostars	2022
SEAWave	EU	HORIZON Europe / SERI	2022
STASIS	EU/CH	EURAMET / SERI	2022
UNMOD	CH/EU	Weave	2023
TIME	CH/EU	Weave	2025

== The REFLEX project controversy ==
The aim of the EU FP5 REFLEX project — Risk Evaluation of Potential Environmental Hazards From Low Frequency Electromagnetic Field Exposure Using Sensitive In Vitro Methods — was to apply advanced methods and procedures developed in toxicology and molecular biology to investigate the basic mechanisms of cellular and sub-cellular responses to exposure to EM energy. The coordinator of the REFLEX consortium was Prof. Franz Adlkofer of the VERUM Foundation; there were 8 biological laboratory partners to perform in vitro experiments, for which the IT'IS Foundation developed the exposure systems. Soon after publication of findings from the REFLEX study, allegations of data falsification, data fabrication, and general scientific misconduct were made against project participants, including the IT'IS Foundation. The assertions, which persisted for more than a decade, were laid to rest by a German court of appeals, whereby the author of the unfounded allegations was ordered to cease and desist his attacks on the REFLEX findings.
