= Sim4Life/SEMCAD =

Computer-aided-design software for evaluating electromagnetic devices

Sim4Life
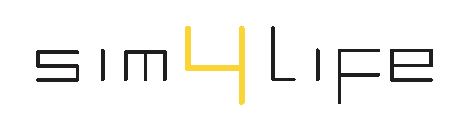
- Developer: ZMT Zurich MedTech AG
- Stable release: V8.2.1 / January 23, 2025; 18 months ago
- Type: Computer-aided design
- Website: www.sim4life.swiss

Sim4Life (V8.x Web and Desktop) is a computational simulation platform developed by ZMT Zurich MedTech AG (ZMT) in Zurich, Switzerland, in partnership with the Foundation for Research on Information Technologies in Society (IT'IS), with funding from Innosuisse (formerly known as CTI), a Swiss federal funding instrument. The Sim4Life platform is an extension of the SEMCAD X Matterhorn computer-aided-design-based simulation platform marketed by IT’IS partner Schmid and Partner Engineering AG (SPEAG), also based in Zurich. The SEMCAD 3D electromagnetic (EM) simulation software has been used for numerical assessment of EM interference and compatibility (EMI/EMC), antenna design and optimization, 5G cellular network research, wireless power transfer (WPT), dosimetry, optics, high-performance computing (HPC), design of microwave and mm-wave waveguide devices, and research on magnetic resonance imaging safety, especially in the context of EM compatibility of implanted medical devices.

All of the functions of SEMCAD, which is no longer on the market, are available as part of the Sim4Life platform, which combines the classical technical computer-aided-design tools of SEMCAD with multi-physics solvers, computational human phantoms, medical-image-based modeling, and physiological tissue models. The Sim4Life platform is used in personalized medicine applications for optimization of treatments involving medical devices and the safety of magnetic resonance imaging. Sim4Life has also been used by medical researchers to study non-invasive methods of brain stimulation and transcranial focused ultrasound.

Sim4Life.lite is an online version of Sim4Life that is free-of-charge for students for team-learning and online collaboration with classmates and teachers on limited size projects. Sim4Life.lite and Sim4Life.web rely on open-source o²S²PARC technologies, which were developed as part of the 'Stimulating Peripheral Activity to Relieve Conditions' (SPARC) program of the National Institutes of Health Common Fund to enable collaborative, reproducible, and sustainable computational neurosciences.
