= Battleship steel =

Battleship steel could refer to:

- Types of steel used as armour on battleships:
  - Harvey armour
  - Krupp armour
- Low-background steel, derived from battleships that sank before the advent of nuclear weapons testing
