= Reserve fleet =

Collection of inactive naval vessels

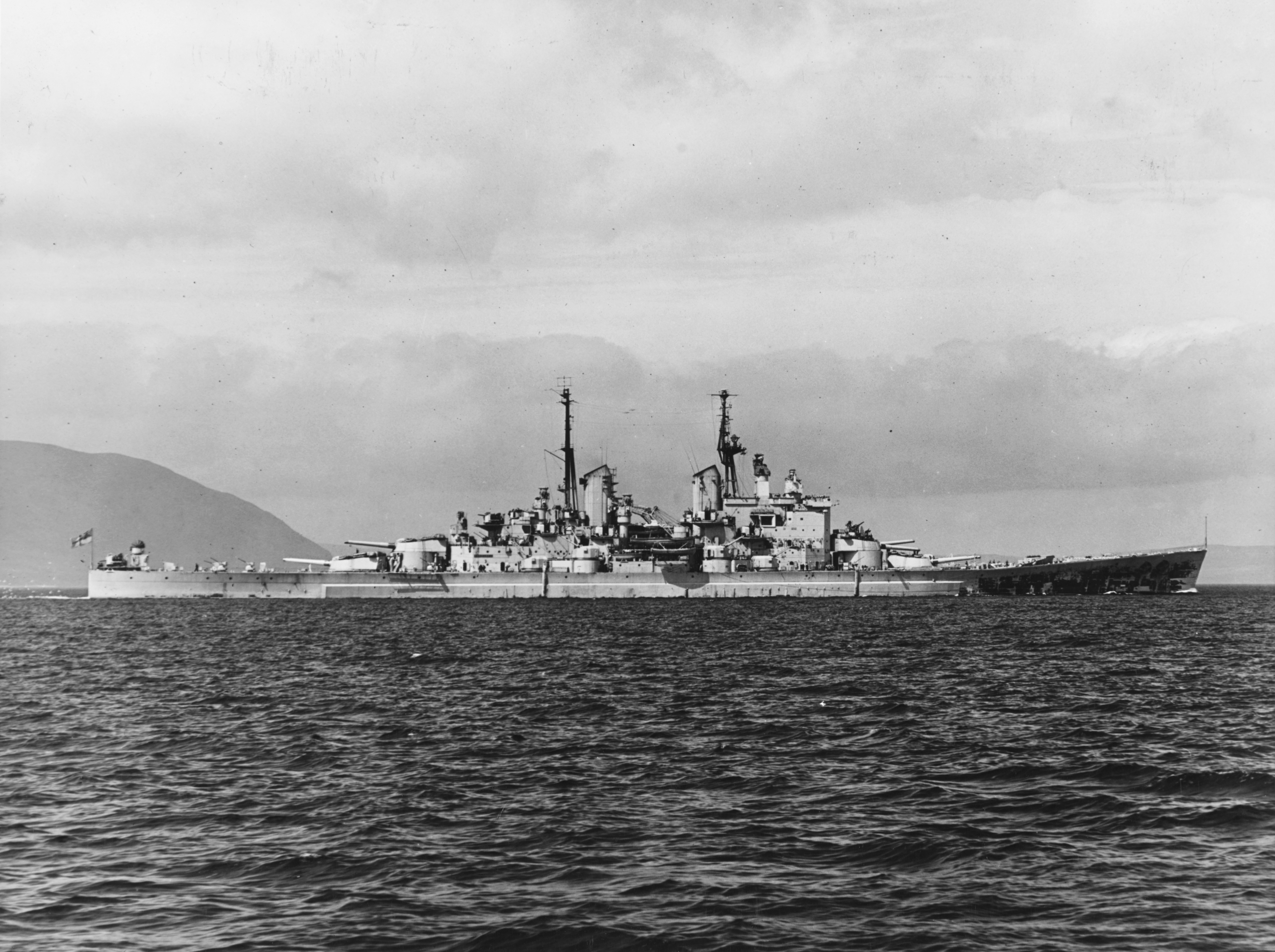
HMS Vanguard in about 1947, when it was part of the British Reserve Fleet

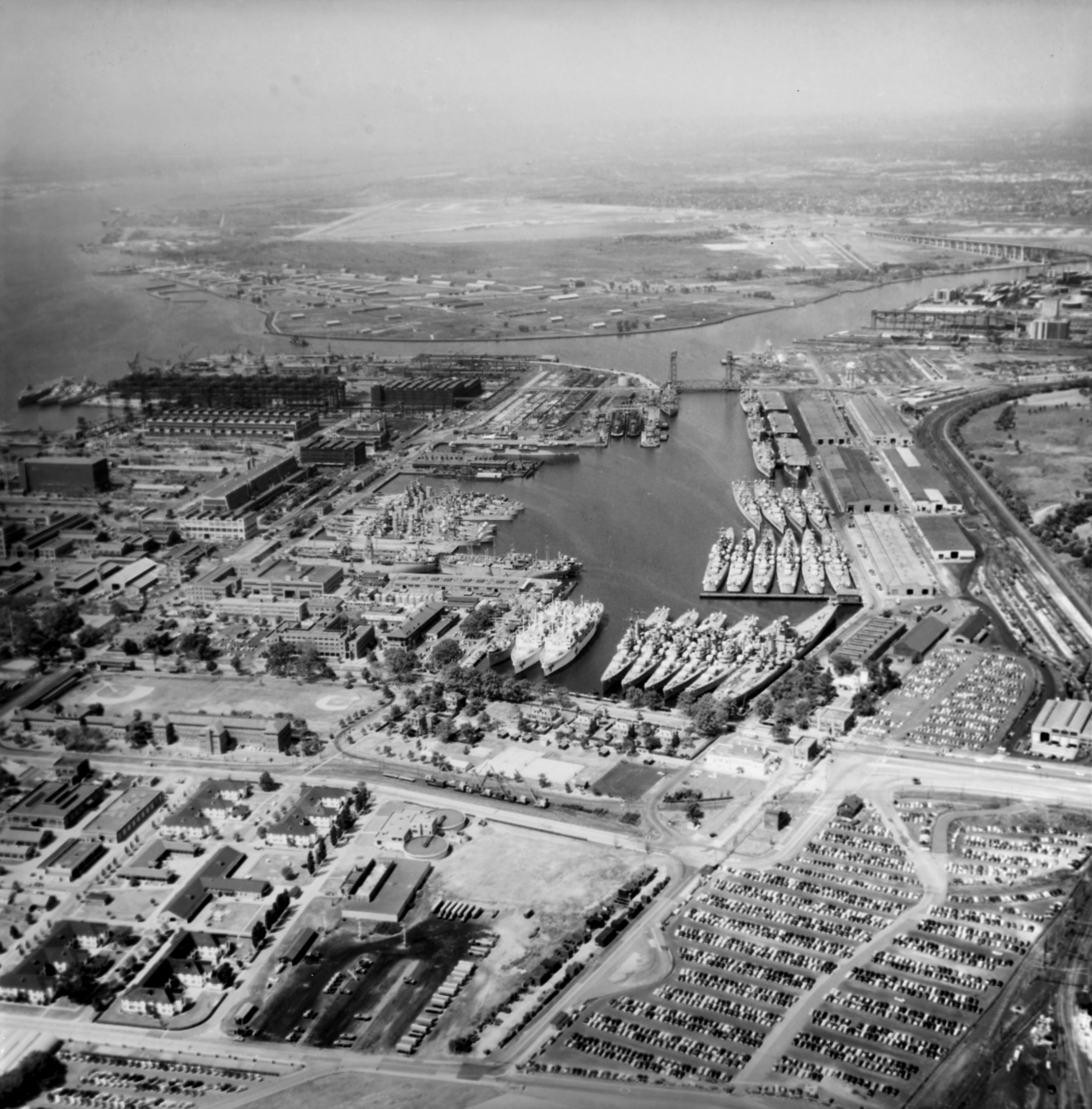
Ships of the U.S. Navy's Reserve Fleet in the Reserve Basin at the Philadelphia Naval Shipyard, 1956

A reserve fleet is a collection of naval vessels of all types that are fully equipped for service but are not currently needed; they are partially or fully decommissioned. A reserve fleet is informally said to be "in mothballs" or "mothballed". In earlier times, especially in British usage, the ships were said to be "laid up in ordinary".

A reserve fleet may be colloquially referred to as a "ghost fleet". In the 21st century, ghost fleet may also refer to an active shadow fleet of aged reserve fleet oil tankers returned to an active service in order to circumvent commodities sanctions.

== Overview ==
Such ships are held in reserve against a time when it may be necessary to call them back into service. They are usually tied up in backwater areas near naval bases or shipyards in order to speed the reactivation process. They may be modified for storage during such a period, for instance by having rust-prone areas sealed off or wrapped in plastic or, in the case of sailing warships, the masts removed. While being held in the reserve fleet, ships typically have a minimal crew (known informally as a skeleton crew) to ensure that they stay in somewhat usable condition. For instance, bilge pumps need to be run regularly to reduce corrosion of their steel and to prevent the ships from foundering at their moorings.

When a ship is placed into reserve status, the various parts and weapon systems that the ship uses are also placed in a storage facility, so that if the warship is reactivated, the proper spare parts and ammunition are available. Like the ships, however, the stored parts and equipment are prone to fall into disrepair, suffer metal corrosion, and become obsolete.

== Principal reserve fleets ==
The British Reserve Fleet was a repository for British decommissioned warships from about 1800 until 1960.

The United States National Defense Reserve Fleet (NDRF), consisted of about fifty World War II ships that were moored in Suisun Bay (Suisun Bay Reserve Fleet) near San Francisco since the 1950s or '60s. The fleet included military cargo ships, troopships and tankers. As of mid-2021 there are just two ships anchored in that area. Additional NDRF vessels are moored at the fleet sites at Newport News, Virginia (James River Reserve Fleet); Beaumont, Texas (Beaumont Reserve Fleet); and at designated outported berths.

== Alternatives ==
In practice most reserve ships rapidly become obsolete and are scrapped, used for experiments, target practice, sold to other nations (and occasionally to private companies for civilian conversion), become museum ships or artificial reefs.

Alternatives to reserve fleets include exporting the vessels for shipbreaking, or dismantling. More recently, the U.S. Navy has established a program to allow ships, such as Oriskany, to be sunk in selected locations to create artificial reefs.

Recycling is another option, as in the case of the United States National Defense Reserve Fleet (NDRF), the ships of which are set to be stripped of their paint, cut into pieces, and then recycled.

Steel from pre-nuclear age ships either mothballed or sunk and raised, called low-background steel, is used in experimental physics when the experiment requires shielding material which is itself only extremely weakly radioactive, emitting less than present-day background radiation; materials which were manufactured after atmospheric nuclear explosions had taken place reflect the higher ambient level of radioactivity that fallout has caused.

== Environmental concerns ==
The practice of exporting and dismantling ships has caused international protests as they contain toxic materials. In 2007, following studies that found that 20 tons of lead paint had flaked off the ships of the NDRF, environmentalist groups sued to have them removed. The U.S. Federal Maritime Administration agreed to remove more than 50 of the ships as a result, 25 of which have been removed by 2012 and the remainder removed at the end of 2017.

== See also ==
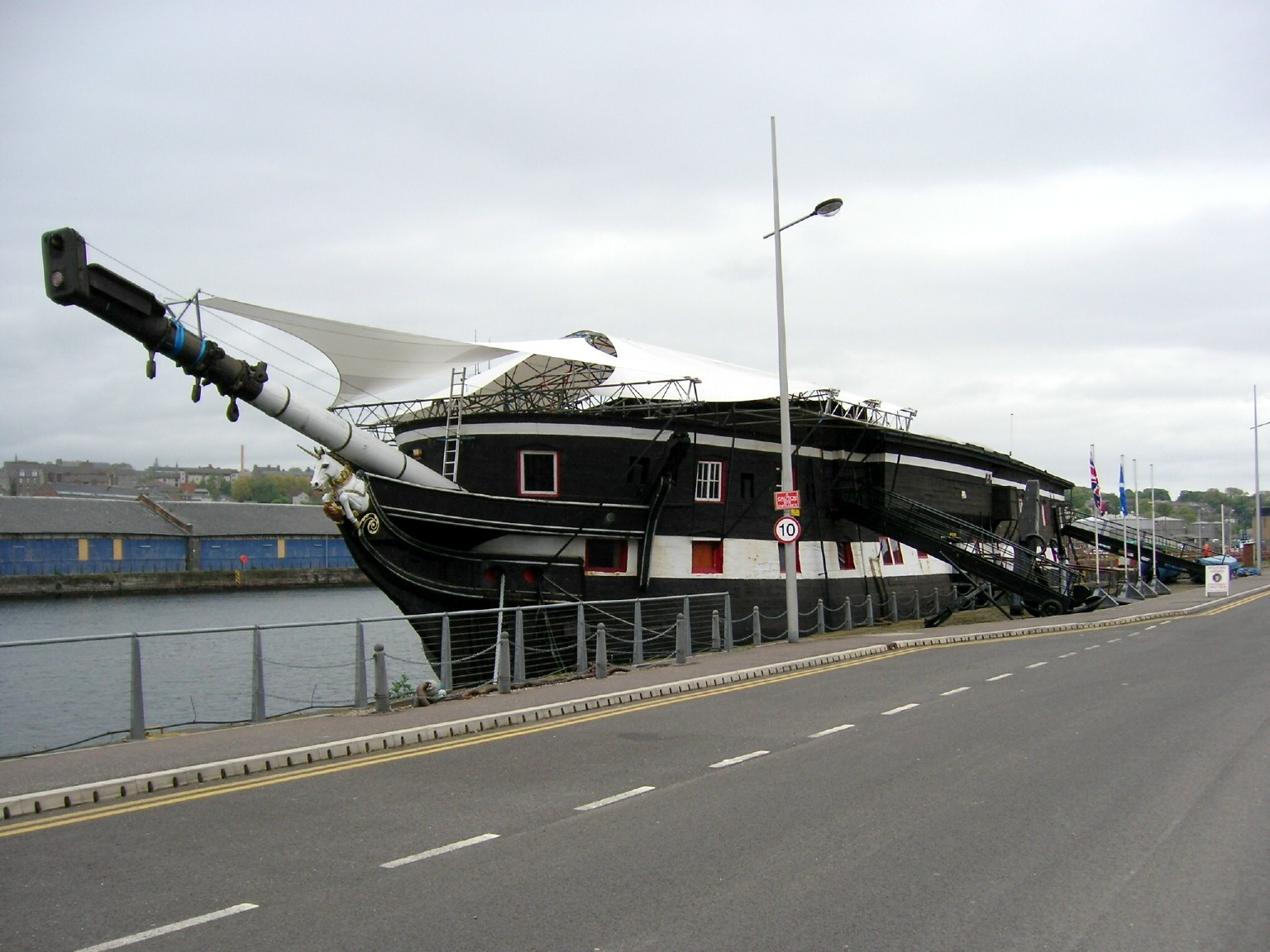
HMS Unicorn in ordinary

- Aircraft graveyard
- National Defense Reserve Fleet
- Suisun Bay Reserve Fleet
- United States Navy reserve fleets
