= Imaging phantom =

Object used for testing medical visualization devices

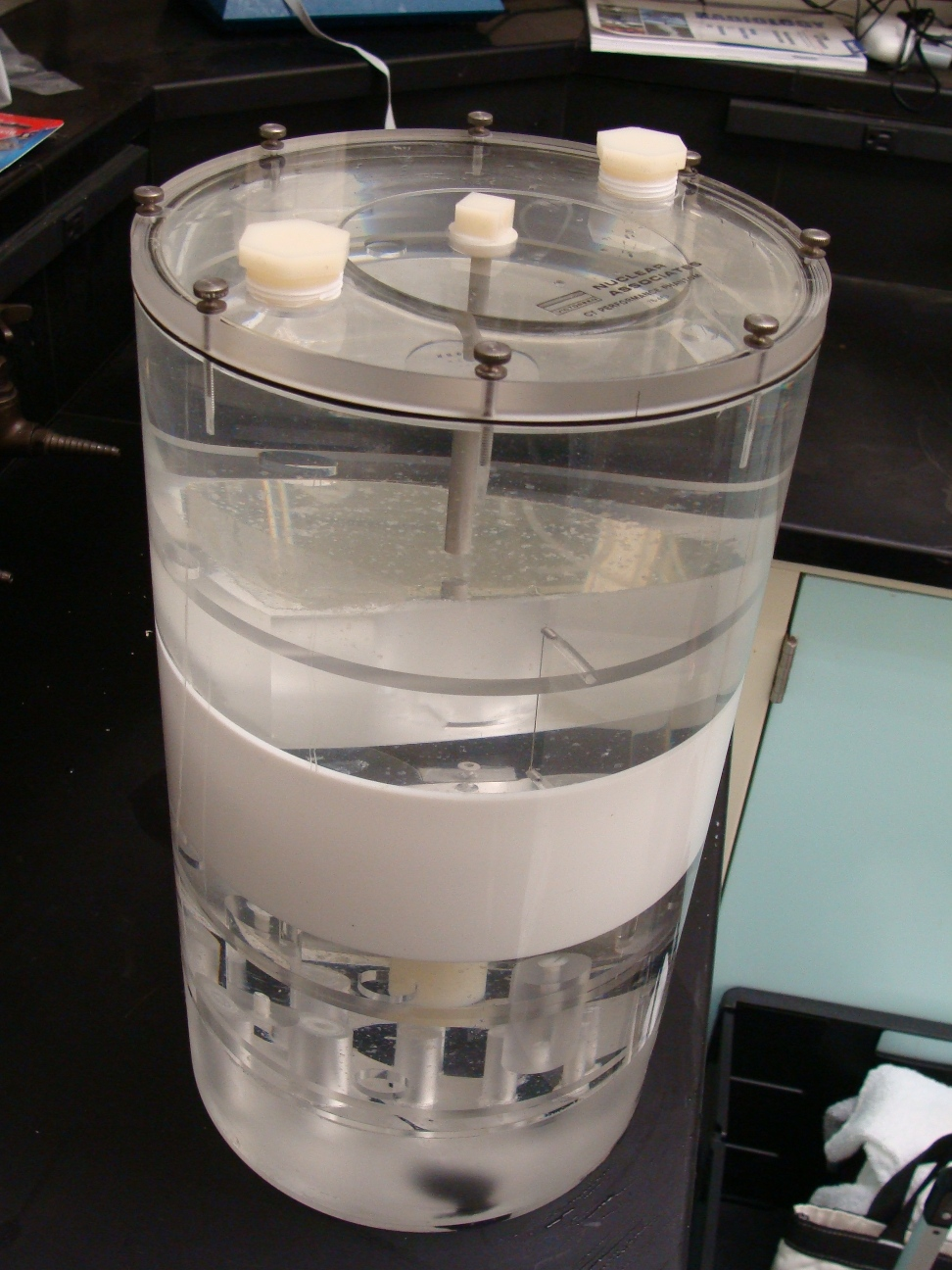
An imaging phantom for determining CT performance

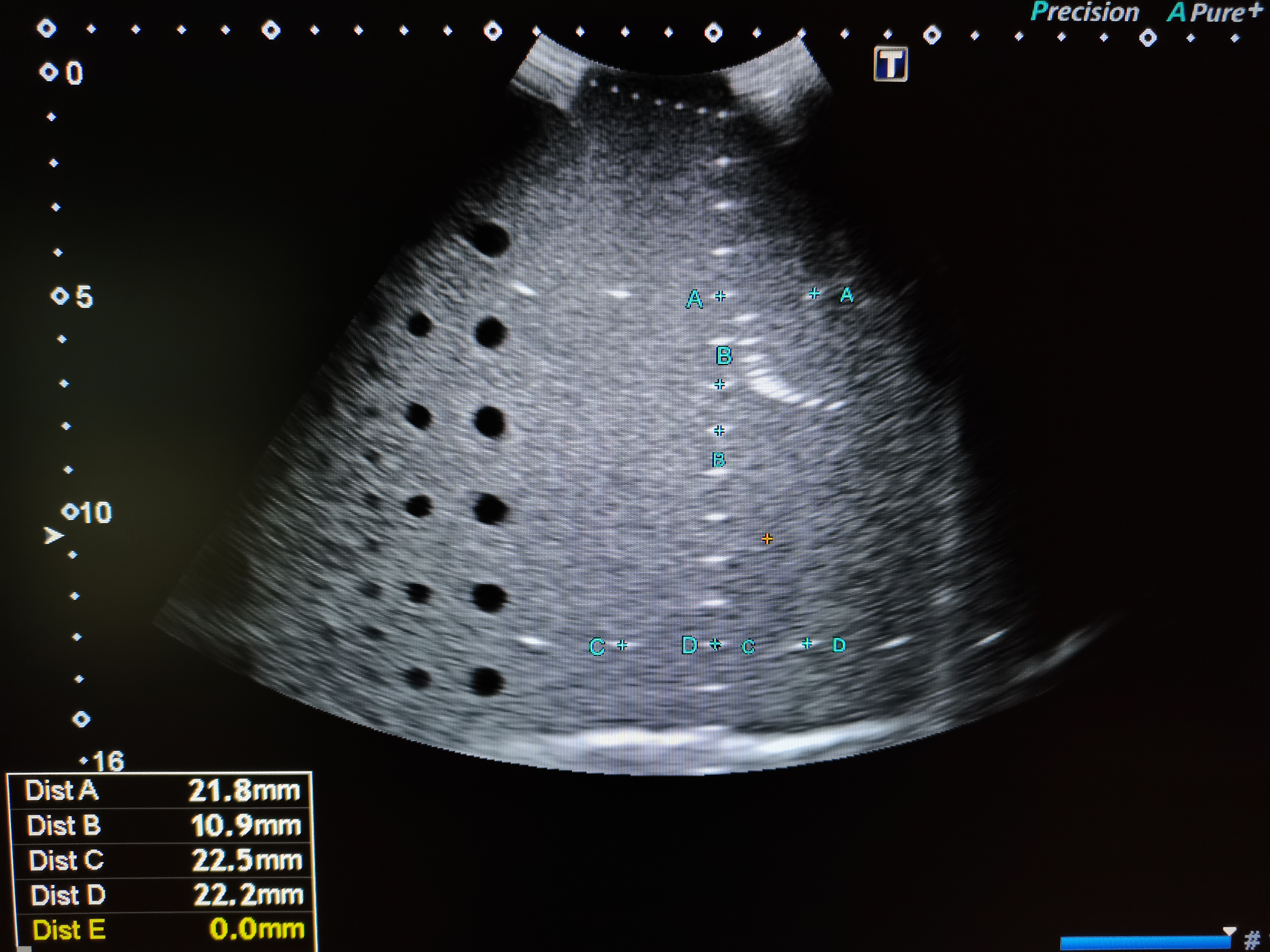
Imaging phantom as seen on a medical ultrasound machine

An imaging phantom, or simply phantom (less commonly spelled fantom), is a specially designed object that is scanned or imaged in the field of medical imaging to evaluate, analyze, and tune the performance of various imaging devices. A phantom is more readily available and provides more consistent results than the use of a living subject or cadaver, while also avoiding direct risks to living subjects. Phantoms were originally employed in 2D x-ray–based imaging techniques such as radiography or fluoroscopy, but more recently phantoms with desired imaging characteristics have been developed for 3D techniques such as SPECT, MRI, CT, ultrasound, PET, and other imaging modalities.

== Design ==
A phantom used to evaluate an imaging device should respond in a similar manner to how human tissues and organs would act in that specific imaging modality. For instance, phantoms made for 2D radiography may hold various quantities of x-ray contrast agents with similar x-ray absorbing properties (such as the attenuation coefficient) to normal tissue to tune the contrast of the imaging device or modulate the patient's exposure to radiation. In such a case, the radiography phantom would not necessarily need to have similar textures and mechanical properties since these are not relevant in x-ray imaging modalities. However, in the case of ultrasonography, a phantom with similar rheological and ultrasound scattering properties to real tissue would be essential, but x-ray absorbing properties would not be relevant.

The term "phantom" describes an object that is designed to resemble human tissue and can be evaluated, analyzed or manipulated to study the performance of a medical device. Phantoms are created using a digital file that is rendered through magnetic resonance imaging (MRI) or computer-aided design (CAD). The digital files allow for quick modifications that are read by the 3D printer. The 3D printer will create the product in successive layers using polymeric materials. There are several types of phantoms including tissue-mimicking, radiological phantoms, dental phantoms, BOMABs (used to calibrate whole-body counters), and more.

== See also ==
- Bomab
- Computational human phantom
- Jaszczak phantom
- Phantom structure
- Shepp–Logan phantom
