= Minimum detectable activity =

Measurement concept in nuclear physics

Minimum detectable activity (MDA) is the lowest activity of a radioactive nuclide that can be detected with a detector, to some confidence level. It is a concept that is used in several circumstances, such as in whole-body counting or radiation monitoring, to aid in determining the presence or absence of a radioactive substance or comparing the performance of different detector systems. There are several ways to calculate MDA that are commonly used, including the ISO11929 standard and the Currie method. The Currie method is given by

$MDA = \frac{L_D}{\epsilon \cdot P \cdot t}$,

where $L_D$ is the detection limit in units of counts, $\epsilon$ is the detection efficiency of the detector, $P$ is the emission probability of the radiation, and $t$ is the live time of the measurement. The formula for $L_D$ will vary depending on the specified confidence level. For false-negative and false-positive rates of 5%,

$L_D = 2.71 + 4.65 \sqrt{B}$,

where $B$ is the background counts. In other words, to achieve a low MDA, low background counts and a high efficiency are desired. This is usually referred to as the Currie detection limit.

Methods to decrease MDAs include utilizing coincidence measurements, large detection volumes, or using large shielding and underground measurement facilities.

== Currie detection limit - derivation ==
The Currie detection limit is derived from the number of gross counts G and the number of background counts B and an accepted false positive rate of 5%. The derivation assumes that both G and B follow a Gaussian distribution.

The number of net counts N in a peak is given as

$N = G - B$

Using that G and B follow a Gaussian distribution, the standard deviation of N is

$\sigma_N^2 = \sigma_G^2 + \sigma_B^2$

If the number of counts N is below a critical limit $L_C$, the conclusion is that no detection is made. The value of $L_C$ depends on the background and is derived by observing the case where only background activity is present. In this case, the mean of N is zero and an uncertainty is

$\sigma_N = \sqrt{2}\sigma_B$

since $\sigma_G = \sigma_B$ if there is only background.

To achieve a false positive rate of 5%, $L_C$ must be chosen such that the probability that a random sample lies below $L_C$ is 95%. Since B follows a Gaussian distribution, it is known that 90% of values lie within 1.64 sigma of the mean. In this case, only positive deviation are of concern and the probability is 95% that a random sample lies below the mean plus $1.64\sigma$. Thus, the critical limit can be set to

$L_C = 1.64\sigma_N = 1.64\sqrt{2}\sigma_B$

Looking now at the case where there is activity present that does not belong to the background, the detection limit $L_D$ can be determined. The detection limit is determined so that 95% of samples from the net count distribution N lies above the critical limit

$L_D = L_C + 1.64\sigma_{L_D}$

Assuming N follows a Gaussian distribution where the width is only caused by statistical uncertainties from counting, setting N to $L_D$ (minimum amount of counts that will lead to a detection) gives

$\sigma_{L_D}^2 = \sigma_G^2 + \sigma_B^2 = (\sqrt{G})^2 + (\sqrt{B})^2 = L_D + 2B$

Using this together with the definition of $L_C$ results in

$L_D = 1.64\left(\sqrt{2B} + \sqrt{L_D +2B}\right)$

Which after solving for $L_D$ gives

$L_D = 2.71 + 4.65\sqrt{B}$
