= X. George Xu =

Chinese-born American scientist

Xie George Xu
- Born: Wuhan, China
- Citizenship: United States
- Education: Texas A&M University (Ph.D.); Xidian University (B.S.)
- Known for: Monte Carlo simulations, Radiation dosimetry, Computational human phantoms
- Scientific career
- Fields: Nuclear engineering Health physics Medical physics
- Workplaces: Rensselaer Polytechnic Institute

Xie George Xu (born in Wuhan, China) is a Chinese physicist. Previously the Edward E. Hood Chair Professor of Engineering at Rensselaer Polytechnic Institute (RPI), he relocated to China in 2020 and joined the faculty of the University of Science and Technology of China in Hefei. Xu is a Fellow of the American Nuclear Society (ANS), Health Physics Society (HPS), American Association of Physicists in Medicine (AAPM) and the American Institute for Medical and Biological Engineering (AIMBE).

== Academic career ==
George Xu received a B.S. in Physics from Xidian University in Xi'an, China in 1983. After working several years, he came to study in the United States where he received a Ph.D. in Nuclear Engineering from Texas A&M University in 1994. He then joined RPI as Assistant Professor (with a joint appointment as the Director of the Office Radiation and Nuclear Safety) and was promoted to Associate Professor with tenure in 2001 and then Professor in 2006. From 2011 to 2013, he served as the Head of the Nuclear Engineering Program at RPI.

Xu led the Rensselaer Radiation Measurement and Dosimetry Group (RRDMG). He and his colleagues were interested in novel computational and experimental methods that have important and diverse applications in radiation protection, radiation measurement, shielding design, reactor modeling, medical imaging, and radiotherapy. In particular, he uses Monte Carlo simulations as a research tool and has nearly 30 years of experience in various production Monte Carlo codes. His recent research projects have included such diverse topics as parallel Monte Carlo computing using GPU/CUDA, nanomaterials-based x-ray sources, X-ray computed tomography (CT) and proton radiotherapy, compressive sensing. Xu has directed numerous projects, with a total of about $20 million in grant funding from agencies such as the National Science Foundation, Department of Energy, National Institutes of Health, National Institute of Standards and Technology, and Electric Power Research Institute, as well as private nuclear power industry. Up to 2022, Xu has graduated nearly 100 Ph.D. and M.S. students and authored/co-authored 200 peer-reviewed journal papers and books chapters, 400 conference abstracts, 150 invited seminars and presentations, 15 patents/disclosures and 5 industrial/commercial software packages. An internationally recognized leading expert in Monte Carlo computation and radiation protection dosimetry, Xu is a co-founder of the International Consortium of Computational Human Phantoms and co-edited Handbook of Anatomical Models for Radiation Dosimetry.

== Research contributions ==
Xu and his students pioneered a method to use cadaver images to construct voxel human phantoms that are anatomically realistic. Xu et al. 2000 reported, for the first time, a method in adopting a set of high-fidelity color image dataset from the Visible Human Project to develop the VIP-Man phantom which remains today to be one of the “finest” voxel phantoms with a voxel size of 0.33mm x 0.33mm x 1 mm. The phantom sets a world record in the total number of voxels in Monte Carlo simulations ¾ 4 billion voxels which required special treatment in the Monte Carlo code. The methodology behind the development of VIP-Man phantom represented a breakthrough in using “voxels” in Monte Carlo dose calculations for the human body. This is the first time when the bone marrow and eye lenses were directly segmented and identified in the phantom for radiation dosimetry purposes. His group was the first to have developed a capability in using four different Monte Carlo codes (MCNP, MCNPX, EGS, GEANT4) for voxel phantom dose calculations involving photons, electrons, protons, and many other heavy ions. The VIP-Man phantom, which has been shared with several hundreds of researchers worldwide, made it possible to study radiation dosimetry in health physics as well as medical physics (medical imaging and radiotherapy). As of May 15, 2012, this paper has been cited 266 times and, according to Google Scholar, is the most cited paper in “computational dosimetry phantoms”. For this work, Dr. Xu was awarded the National Science Foundation's Faculty CAREER Award in 1999. He is one of the few nuclear engineering faculty members who have received this highly selective award.

Xu et al. 2007 reported a method for developing the 3rd-generation computational phantoms using the so-called “boundary representation (BREP)” geometry – NURBS and triangular meshes developed by the computer graphics community. Dr. Xu and students demonstrated, for the first time, that it was possible to rapidly create phantoms representing a pregnant mother at the end of 3-, 6-, and 9-month gestational periods without relying on patient images that are difficult to obtain for pregnant patients. This innovative method also afforded the ability to simulate changes in human posture as well as physiology-caused organ deformation such as respiration. This paper was rated among 10 of the best and most popular articles by the journal of Physics in Medicine and Biology and was one of the finalists for the Roberts’ Prize in 2007.

Han et al. 2010 investigated a pair of phantoms that represent individuals walking on contaminated ground.

Ding et al. 2012 examined the effect of obesity on the calculated radiation dose from CT. Xu and his students developed the first set of overweight and obese phantoms. This was the most downloaded PMB article in 2012. This study received more than 130 pieces of worldwide media coverage about this study (within 30 days after the publication).

In 2005, Dr. Xu co-founded the Consortium of Computational Human Phantoms (CCHP) -- an international collaborative project that promotes research and standardization among researchers. As part of the CCHP's initiatives, Dr. Xu co-edited the “Handbook of Anatomical Models for Radiation Dosimetry” that provides, for the first time, a comprehensive summary of 50 years of research related to computational phantoms for radiation dosimetry. After two years of preparation involving 60 authors from 13 countries, the 30-chapter book was published in 2009. Following the publication of this important book, Dr. Xu continued to play a leading role in the international community by organizing and chairing The Third International Workshop on Computational Phantoms for Radiation Protection, Imaging and Radiotherapy in Beijing, China on August 8 and 9, 2011.

== Honors and awards ==
- National Science Foundation CAREER Award (1999)
- President, Council on Ionizing Radiation Measurements and Standards (CIRMS) (1999)
- Research Excellence Award, Rensselaer Polytechnic Institute School of Engineering (2006)
- Member, National Council on Radiation Protection and Measurements (NCRP) (2008–present)
- Fellow, American Association of Physicists in Medicine (AAPM) (2009–present).
- Outstanding Research Team Award, RPI School of Engineering (2012)
- Fellow, American Nuclear Society (ANS) (2012–present)
- Professional Excellence Award, ANS Radiation Protection and Shielding Division (RPSD) (2012)
- US Environmental Protection Agency (EPA) Science Advisory Board (SAB) Radiation Advisory Committee (2012-2015)
- Fellow, Health Physics Society (HPS) (2013–present)
- Edward E. Hood Endowed Chair of Engineering, RPI (2014–2020)
- Randal S. Caswell Award for Distinguished Achievements, CIRMS (2015)
- Panel member for Physical Measurement Laboratory of the National Institute of Standards and Technology, by the Laboratory Assessments Board of the National Academies (2015)
- Outstanding Research Team Award, RPI School of Engineering (2016)
- Distinguished Scientific Achievement Award, HPS (2018)
- Edith H. Quimby Lifetime Achievement in Medical Physics, AAPM (2020)
- Arthur Holly Compton Award in Education, ANS (2020)
- Rockwell Lifetime Achievement Award in Radiation Protection and Shielding, ANS (2020)
- Hall of Fame, North American Chinese Medical Physicists Association (2021)
- IUPESM Award of Merit in Medical Physics, International Union for Physical and Engineering Sciences in Medicine (IUPESM) (2022)

== Book chapters and invited journal reviews ==
- Xu, Xie George; Eckerman, Kieth F., eds. (2010). Handbook of Anatomical Models for Radiation Dosimetry. CRC. ISBN 978-1-4200-5979-3.
- Xu XG, Bednarz B, Paganetti H (July 2008). "A review of dosimetry studies on external-beam radiation treatment with respect to second cancer induction". Physics in Medicine and Biology. 53 (13): R193–241. doi:10.1088/0031-9155/53/13/R01. PMC 4009374. PMID 18540047.
- Zaidi H, Xu XG (2007). "Computational anthropomorphic models of the human anatomy: the path to realistic Monte Carlo modeling in radiological sciences". Annual Review of Biomedical Engineering. 9: 471–500. doi:10.1146/annurev.bioeng.9.060906.151934. PMID 17298237. S2CID 18941120.
- Xu, X. George (2006). "Modeling of Human Anatomy for Radiation Dosimetry: An Example of the VIP-Man Model". Applied Modeling and Computations in Nuclear Science. ACS Symposium Series. Vol. 945. pp. 115–30. doi:10.1021/bk-2007-0945.ch009. ISBN 978-0-8412-3982-1.
