= Jaszczak phantom =

A Jaszczak phantom (Polish pronunciation: [ˈjaʂ.t͡ʂak]) aka Data Spectrum ECT phantom is an imaging phantom used for validating scanner geometry, 3D contrast, uniformity, resolution, attenuation and scatter correction or alignment tasks in nuclear medicine. It is commonly used in academic centers and hospitals to characterize a SPECT or some gamma camera systems for quality control purposes. It is used for accreditation by clinical and academic facilities for the American College of Radiology.

The phantom was developed by Ronald J. Jaszczak of Duke University, and a patent was filed for in 1982. It is a cylinder containing fillable inserts that is often used with a radionuclide such as technetium-99m or fluorine-18.

Although the phantom can be used for acceptance testing, the National Electrical Manufacturers Association recommends a 30 million count acquisition and section reconstruction of the phantom be performed quarterly.

In 1981 Ronald J. Jaszczak founded Data Spectrum Corporation, which manufactures the Jaszczak phantom and several other nuclear imaging tools, such as the Hoffman Brain phantom.

== Structure and composition ==
Jaszczak phantoms consist of a main cylinder or tank made of acrylic plastic with several inserts. The circular phantom comes in two varieties: flanged and flangeless. The latter is recommended by the American College of Radiology for accreditation of nuclear medicine departments. All Jaszczak phantoms have six solid spheres and six sets of 'cold' rods. In flanged models, the sizes of the spheres vary. The number of rods in each set depends on the size of the rod in that set as different models of the phantom have rods of different sizes. In flangeless models, the diameters of the spheres are 9.5, 12.7, 15.9, 19.1, 25.4 and 31.8 mm, while the rod diameters are 4.8, 6.4, 7.9, 9.5, 11.1 and 12.7 mm. Both solid spheres and rod inserts mimic cold lesions in a hot background. Spheres are used to measure the image contrast while the rods are used to investigate the image resolution in SPECT systems.
