= Bomab =

Specialized mannequin used to calibrate radioactivity detectors

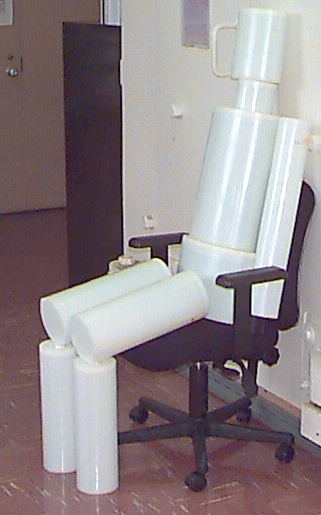
BOMAB phantom sitting

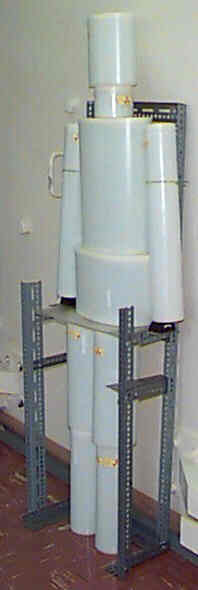
BOMAB phantom standing

The BOttle MAnnequin ABsorber imaging phantom was developed by F. Bush in 1949, and has since been accepted in North America as the industry standard for calibrating whole-body counting systems.

The phantom consists of 10 polyethylene bottles, either cylinders or elliptical cylinders, that represent the head, neck, chest, abdomen, thighs, calves, and arms. Each section is filled with a radioactive solution, in water, that has the amount of radioactivity proportional to the volume of each section. This simulates a homogeneous (even) distribution of material throughout the body. The solution will also be acidified and contain a stable element carrier so that the radioactivity does not plate out on the container walls.

The phantom, which contains a known amount of radioactivity can be used to calibrate the whole body counter by relating the observed response to the known amount of radioactivity. Because different radioactive materials emit different energies of gamma photons, the calibration has to be repeated to cover the expected energy range: usually 120 to 2,000 keV. Examples of radioactive isotopes that are used for efficiency calibration include cobalt-57, cobalt-60, yttrium-88, caesium-137, and europium-152.

Although the phantom was designed to be used lying down, it can be used in any orientation. There are also several variations of the BOMAB with different proportions, designed to simulate women, children, and variations in body fat percentage.

== Other uses ==
Phantoms can be used to evaluate the relative effect of size, shape, and positioning on the performance of in vivo measurement equipment. A water-filled BOMAB is often used to estimate the (blank) background for in vivo assay systems. A BOMAB filled with approximately 140 g of potassium-40, which is the nominal content in a 70 kg man, is sometimes used to estimate detection sensitivity of in vivo personnel counting systems.

BOMAB phantoms are sometimes used by performance testing organizations to test operating assay facilities. Phantoms containing known quantities of radioactive material are sent to assay facilities as blind samples.

== See also ==
- Computational human phantom
- Imaging phantom
