= Computational human phantom =

Computational human phantoms are models of the human body

Computational human phantoms are models of the human body used in computerized analysis. Since the 1960s, the radiological science community has developed and applied these models for ionizing radiation dosimetry studies. These models have become increasingly accurate with respect to the internal structure of the human body.

As computing evolved, so did the phantoms. Graduating from phantoms based on simple quadratic equations to voxelized phantoms, which were based on actual medical images of the human body, was a major step. The newest models are based on more advanced mathematics, such as non-uniform rational B-spline (NURBS) and polygon meshes, which allow for 4-D phantoms where simulations can take place not only 3-dimensional space but in time as well.

Phantoms have been developed for a wide variety of humans, from children to adolescents to adults, male and female, as well as pregnant women. With such a variety of phantoms, many kinds of simulations can be run, from dose received from medical imaging procedures to nuclear medicine. Over the years, the results of these simulations have created an assortment of standards that have been adopted in the International Commission on Radiological Protection (ICRP) recommendations.

== Stylized (first-generation) computational phantoms ==
The very first generation computational phantoms were developed to address the need to better assess organ doses from internally deposited radioactive materials in workers and patients. Until the late 1950s, the ICRP still used very simple models. In these calculations, each organ of the body was assumed to be represented as a sphere with an "effective radius". The radionuclide of interest was assumed to be located at the center of the sphere and the "effective absorbed energy" was calculated for each organ. Phantoms such as the Shepp-Logan Phantom were used as models of a human head in the development and testing of image reconstruction algorithms. However, scientists attempted to model individual organs of the body and ultimately the entire human body in a realistic manner, the efforts of which led to stylized anthropomorphic phantoms that resemble the human anatomy.

In general, stylized computational phantom is a mathematical representation of the human body which, when coupled with a Monte Carlo radiation transport computer code, can be used to track the radiation interactions and energy deposition in the body. The feature of stylized computational phantom is finely tuned by adjusting individual parameters of the mathematical equations, which describes the volume, position, and shape of individual organs. Stylized computational phantom has a long history of development through the 1960s to 1980s.

=== MIRD phantom ===
The MIRD phantom was developed by Fisher and Snyder at Oak Ridge National Laboratory in the 1960s with 22 internal organs and more than 100 sub-regions. It is the first anthropomorphic phantom representing a hermaphrodite adult for internal dosimetry.

=== Phantoms derived from MIRD ===
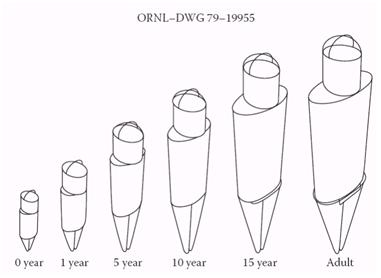
"Family" phantom series

Based on MIRD phantom, many derivations of phantoms were developed for the following decades. The major types of phantom include: stylized "Family" phantom series developed in the 1980s by Cristy and Eckerman; "ADAM and EVA" developed by GSF, Germany; CAM (Computerized Anatomical Man) phantom developed by NASA unknown by the mainstream radiation protection dosimetry community, etc.

=== Limitation on stylized phantom ===
Although many efforts were undertaken to diversify and extend its applications in radiation protection, radiation therapy, and medical imaging, one cannot overcome its inborn limitation. The representation of internal organs in this mathematical phantom was crude, by capturing only the most general description of the position and geometry of each organ. With the powerful computer and tomographic imaging technologies became available in the late 1980s, the history launched a new era of voxel phantoms.

== Voxel (second-generation) phantoms ==
The stylized phantoms provided only basic information with a large degree of error. More accurate methods of simulating a human body were necessary to advance. To allow further research, the computer technology had to become more powerful and more readily available. This did not occur until the 1980s. The real breakthrough occurred when computed tomography (CT) and magnetic resonance imaging (MRI) devices could generate highly accurate images of internal organs in three dimensions and in digital format. Researchers discovered that they could take that diagnostic data and transform it into a voxel (volumetric pixel) format, essentially re-creating the human body in digital form in 3D. Today there are over 38 human phantoms in voxel format, for many different uses.

=== Challenges for implementation ===
Two major issues with development of the reference phantoms are difficulty in obtaining useful images and handling the large amount of data created from these images. CT scans give the human body a large dose of ionizing radiation – something the computational phantom was designed to circumvent in the first place. MRI images take a long time to process. Furthermore, most scans of a single subject cover only a small portion of the body, whereas a full scan series is needed for useful data. Handling this data is also difficult. While the newer computers had hard drives large enough to store the data, the memory requirements for processing the images to the desired voxel size were often too steep.

=== Basic development process of a voxel phantom ===
While there have been many voxel phantoms developed, they have all followed a similar path to completion. First, they must obtain the raw data, from CT scans, MRI imaging, or direct imaging through photography. Second, the components of the body must be segmented, or identified and separated from the rest. Third, the density of each component must be identified, along with the composition of each. Lastly, the data must be unified into a single 3D structure so it may be used for analysis.

=== Early developments ===
The earliest work on voxelized phantoms occurred independently at about the same time by Dr. Gibbs, of Vanderbilt University, and Dr. Zankl at the National Research Center for Environment and Health (GSF) in Germany. This occurred about 1982. Dr. Gibb's work started with X-ray images, not CT or MRI images, for the reconstruction of a human phantom which was used for medical dose simulations. M. Zankl and team did use CT imaging to create 12 phantoms, ranging from BABY to VISIBLE HUMAN.

=== Advancements in voxel phantom design by country ===
- United States
  - Dr. Zubal and team at Yale University developed the VoxelMan phantom in 1994. This original phantom was complete only from head-to-torso, and was designed specifically for improving nuclear medicine. Since its initial development it has been improved to include arms and legs to represent a complete human body, and a dedicated head has been completed which delineates the small internal sub-structures of the brain.
  - In 2000, Dr. George Xu and two students at Rensselaer Polytechnic Institute (RPI) created the VIP-Man phantom from data retrieved from the National Library of Medicine's (NLM) Visible Human Project (VHP). This phantom was the most complex model to date, with over 3.7 billion voxels. This model was used in many studies concerning health physics and medical physics.
  - Dr. Bolch and team at the University of Florida created a set of pediatric phantoms from 2002 to 2006. Child computational phantoms had been severely underrepresented until this point. The team developed models ranging from newborn to mid-teens.
  - The U.S. Food and Drug Administration (FDA), in collaboration with the Foundation for Research on Information Technologies in Society (IT'IS) and other partners, developed the surface-based Virtual Family (VF) body phantoms for electromagnetic exposure and thermal evaluations. The four VF models are based on high-resolution magnetic resonance imaging (MRI) data of healthy volunteers (female and male adults and children).
- Switzerland
  - The four VF full body phantoms developed by Prof. Niels Kuster and his team at the IT'IS Foundation in Zurich in collaboration with the U.S. FDA correspond to a 34-year-old adult male, 26-year-old female, an 11-year-old female, and a 6-year-old male – were based on full-body magnetic resonance imaging (MRI) scans of healthy volunteers. The original VF was later expanded with four more juvenile models of the Virtual Classroom. More models – including an elderly male and an obese male – were later added to form the Virtual Population (ViP).
- Brazil
  - Dr. Kramer in Brazil improved on the data from the Yale Zubal team in an attempt to create a phantom similar to International Commission on Radiological Protection requirements, and created the MAX phantom.
- United Kingdom
  - The NORMAN phantom was developed by a team led by Dr. Dimbylow. This was created by analyzing magnetic resonance images of a human male in 1996. In 2005, the team created a female phantom.
- Australia
  - At Flinders University, Dr. Caon and team created a torso phantom to simulate a teenage girl in 1999. The name of the phantom was ADELAIDE. This was the only teenage female phantom for a number of years.
- Japan
  - The first Asian phantom was developed by Dr. Saito and team at the Japan Atomic Energy Research Institute (JAERI) in 2001. This was primarily used for radiation dosimetry studies.
  - Another group, led by Dr. Nagaoka at the National Institute of Information and Communications Technology (NIICT), created a male and female phantom around the same time period as the JAERI group. These were created from MR images.
- Korea
  - Many computational phantoms, both male and female, have been created in Korea. The High-Definition Reference Korean (HDRK) was constructed from high-resolution color photographic images obtained as serial sections of a 33-year-old Korean male cadaver.
- China
  - In the mid-2000s, the Chinese government authorized Dr. Zhang and team at the China Institute for Radiation Protection to create the CNMAN phantom, a Chinese version of the VHP based on a data set from a 35-year-old male cadaver.
- Germany
  - Prof. M. Zankl and co-workers used CT images to construct a variety of individual voxel phantoms, including three pediatric models and a female in the 24th week of pregnancy.

=== Statistical phantom ===
A computational framework was presented, based on statistical shape modelling, for construction of race-specific organ models for internal radionuclide dosimetry and other nuclear-medicine applications. The proposed technique used to create the race-specific statistical phantom maintains anatomic realism and provides the statistical parameters for application to radionuclide dosimetry.

== Boundary representation (third-generation) phantom ==
Boundary representation (BREP) phantoms are computational human models that contain exterior and interior anatomical features of a human body using boundary representation method. In the realm of health and medical physics they are primarily used for ionizing radiation dosimetry.

In the development of computational human phantoms, of particular interest is the concept of a "deformable" phantom whose geometry can be conveniently transformed to fit particular physical organ shapes, volumes, or body postures. Design of this type of phantom is realized by Non-Uniform Rational B-Spline (NURBS) method or polygonal mesh method, which are usually collectively called BREP methods. Compared to the voxel phantoms, BREP phantoms are better suited for geometry deformation and adjustment, because a larger set of computerized operations are available, such as extrusion, chamfering, blending, drafting, shelling, and tweaking. A major advantage of BREP phantoms is their ability to morph into an existing reference phantom or into the anatomy of a real worker or patient, which makes individual-specific dose calculation possible.

=== NURBS-based phantom ===
Surfaces of a non-uniform rational B-spline (NURBS)-based phantom are defined by NURBS equations which are formulated by a set of control points. The shape and volume of a NURBS surface vary with the coordinates of control points. This feature is useful in designing a time-dependent 4D human body modeling. An example is given by NCAT phantoms by Segars et al., which is used to simulate cardiac and respiratory motions with more realistic modeling of the cardiac system.

=== Polygonal mesh-based phantom ===
A polygonal mesh is composed of a set of vertices, edges, and faces that specify the shape of a polyhedral object in 3D space. The surfaces of the phantom are defined by a large amount of polygonal meshes, most commonly triangles. The polygonal mesh has three remarkable advantages in developing whole-body phantoms. Firstly, mesh surfaces depicting human anatomy can be conveniently obtained from real patient images or commercial human anatomy mesh models. Secondly, the polygonal mesh-based phantom has considerable flexibility in adjusting and fine-tuning its geometry, allowing the simulation of very complex anatomies. Thirdly, many commercial computer aided design (CAD) software, such as Rhinoceros, AutoCAD, Visualization Toolkit (VTK), provide built-in functions able to rapidly convert polygonal mesh into NURBS.

=== Development ===
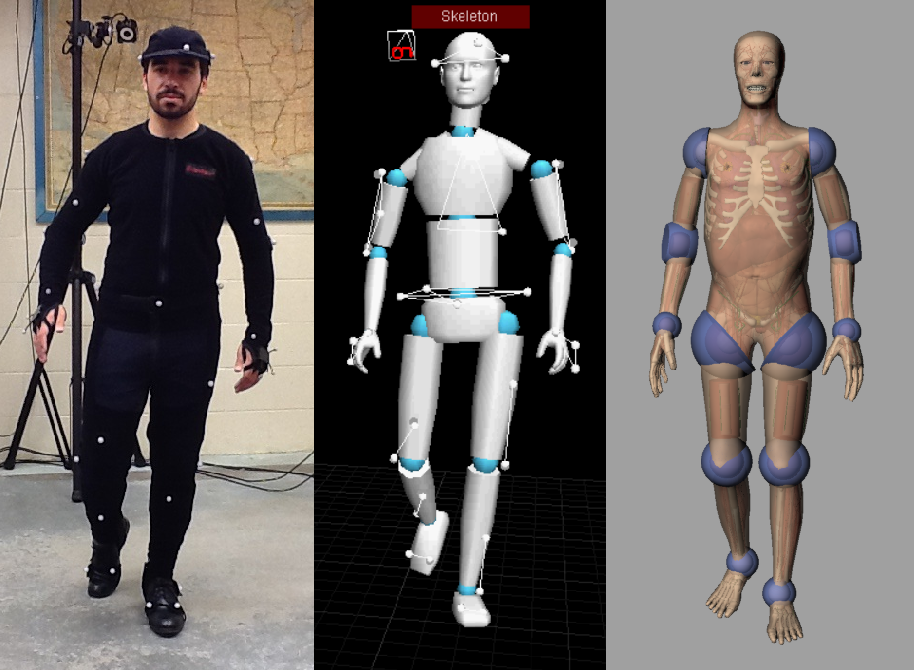
Real-life motion data (left) is acquired on a motion capture platform (center) and used to determine the posture of the CHAD phantom (right).

Segars was the precursor of applying NURBS to phantom design. In 2001 his doctoral thesis described the method of developing a dynamic NURBS-based cardiac-torso (NCAT) phantom in detail. The phantom has a 4D beating heart model which was derived from 4D tagged (MRI) data. The remaining organs in the torso of the phantom were designed based on the Visible Human Project CT data set and were composed of 3D NURBS surfaces. Respiratory motion was also incorporated into this phantom.

In 2005, Xu et al. at Rensselaer Polytechnic Institute used the 3D VIP-Man phantom to simulate respiratory motions by adopting the gated respiratory motion data of the NCAT phantom. The 4D VIP-Man Chest phantom was used to study external-beam treatment planning for a lung cancer patient. In 2007, Xu's research group reported creation of a series of polygon-based phantoms representing a pregnant woman and her fetus at the end of 3, 6, and 9 month gestations (RPI Pregnant Females). The mesh data were initially obtained from separate anatomical information sources including a non-pregnant female, a 7-month pregnant woman CT data set, and a mesh model of the fetus. In 2008, two triangular mesh-based phantoms were created, named as RPI Deformable Adult Male and Female (RPI-AM, RPI-FM). The anatomic parameters of the phantoms were made consistent with two datasets: the mass and density of internal organs originated from ICRP-23 and ICRP-89, and the whole-body height and weight percentile data were obtained from the National Health and Nutrition Examination Survey (NHANES 1999–2002). Later on, to study the relationship between breast size and lung dosimetry, a new group of phantoms were produced by altering the breast geometry of RPI-AF.

From 2006 to 2009, researchers at the University of Florida designed a total of twelve "hybrid" male and female phantoms, representing newborn, 1-, 5-, 10-, and 15-year-old and adult male/females. The phantoms are addressed as "hybrid" because most organs and tissues were modeled by NURBS surfaces whereas the skeleton, brain and extra-thoracic airways were modeled by polygonal surfaces. Anatomic parameters of the phantoms were adjusted to match 4 reference datasets, i.e., standard anthropometric data, reference organ masses from ICRP Publication 89, reference elemental compositions provided in ICRP 89 as well as ICRU Report 46, and reference data on the alimentary tract organs given in ICRP Publications 89 and 100.

In 2008, researchers at Vanderbilt University, in collaboration with researchers from Duke University, developed a family of adult and pediatric phantoms by adapting the NURBS-based NCAT adult male and female phantoms. ICRP-89 reference body and organ values were used to adjust NURBS surfaces.

In 2009 Cassola et al. at the Federal University of Pernambuco, Brazil, developed a pair of polygonal mesh-based phantoms in standing posture, FASH (Female Adult meSH) and MASH (Male Adult meSH). The methodology is very similar but not entirely identical to the one implemented in the designing of RPI-AM and RPI-FM.

In 2010, based on existing RPI-AM, researchers at RPI continued to create 5 more phantoms with different body mass index (BMI) ranging from 23 to 44 kg∙m-2. These phantoms are used to study the correlation between BMI and organ doses resulting from CT and positron emission tomography (PET) examinations.

In 2011 researchers at Hanyang University, Korea, reported a polygon-surface reference Korean male phantom (PSRK-Man). This phantom was constructed by converting the Visible Korean Human-Man (VKH-man) into a polygonal mesh-based phantom. The height, weight, geometry of organs and tissues were adjusted to match the Reference Korean data. Without voxelization the PSRK-man could be directly implemented in Geant4 Monte Carlo simulation using a built-in function, but the computation time was 70~150 times longer than that required by High Definition Reference Korean-Man (HDRK-Man), a voxelized phantom derived also from VKH-man.

In 2012, researchers at RPI developed the Computational Human for Animated Dosimetry (CHAD) phantom, structured such that its posture could be adjusted in conjunction with data obtained using a motion capture system. This phantom can be used to simulate the movement of a worker involved in an occupational of nuclear accident scenario, allowing researchers to gain an understanding of the impact of changing posture in the course of worker movement on radiation dose.

After researchers at the IT’IS Foundation created the four VF models, the collection of body models was extended to form the ViP with four additional pediatric models, obese and elderly male models, as well as a pregnant woman at different gestation stages. These surface-based models developed by IT’IS are widely used in electromagnetic exposure applications. IT’IS also co-developed with the US FDA the MIDA model, a state-of-the-art computational head phantom. More recently, two extremely detailed models that include all major peripheral nerves, based on the Visible Korean female and male cryosection data, were created in cooperation with the Visible Korean team from Ajou University and Dongguk University. A collection of animal models (rodents, pigs, and monkeys) have also been developed for research on non-ionizing dosimetry and its associated risk of cancer.

== Volumetric Mesh (Fourth-Generation) Phantoms ==
=== Overview ===
While boundary representation (BREP) phantoms — including NURBS-based and polygonal (surface) mesh-based phantoms — represented a significant advancement over voxel phantoms, they share a fundamental limitation: they define only the surface of anatomical structures. Internal material properties, density gradients, and heterogeneous tissue compositions within an organ must be inferred or approximated during Monte Carlo transport simulations, often through a voxelization step that reintroduces the geometric stiffness the BREP approach was designed to overcome.

The next evolutionary step in computational human phantom development is the volumetric mesh phantom, most commonly realized as a tetrahedral mesh phantom. Rather than enclosing a volume with surface polygons, a tetrahedral mesh subdivides the entire interior of each organ and tissue structure into a continuous network of tetrahedra — four-faced, three-dimensional elements — enabling direct volumetric representation without voxelization. This approach is referred to as the fourth-generation computational phantom.

=== Tetrahedral mesh representation ===
A tetrahedral mesh is a type of unstructured volumetric mesh in which the spatial domain is partitioned into non-overlapping tetrahedra sharing faces, edges, and vertices. Compared to surface-only polygon mesh phantoms, tetrahedral mesh phantoms offer several key advantages:

- True volumetric fidelity: Each organ's interior is explicitly discretized, allowing direct assignment of material properties at the element level without intermediate voxelization.
- Adaptive resolution: Mesh density can be locally refined near anatomically complex regions (e.g., cortical bone, skin layers, active bone marrow) while remaining coarser elsewhere, balancing accuracy and computational cost.
- Seamless deformability: Established finite element method (FEM) deformation algorithms operate natively on tetrahedral meshes, enabling physiologically realistic organ motion, respiration, and cardiac simulation without geometric artifacts.
- Compatibility with FEM-based physics: Beyond radiation dosimetry, tetrahedral phantoms are directly compatible with biomechanical, thermal, and electromagnetic finite element solvers, supporting true multi-physics simulation.

=== Integration with Monte Carlo radiation transport ===
A key technical milestone enabling the practical use of tetrahedral mesh phantoms was the extension of major Monte Carlo radiation transport codes — particularly Geant4 and MCNP6 — to natively support tetrahedral mesh geometry. Earlier Monte Carlo codes were designed around either combinatorial geometry (as used in stylized phantoms) or rectilinear voxel grids. Supporting unstructured tetrahedral meshes required new particle tracking algorithms capable of computing ray-tetrahedron intersections efficiently.

- Geant4 introduced an advanced example for tetrahedral mesh phantom, allowing direct import of mesh phantoms into full-scale simulation.
- MCNP6 implemented an unstructured mesh (UM) geometry capability, enabling tetrahedral mesh-based phantoms to be simulated without conversion to voxel format, preserving the geometric precision of the original mesh.

This native support eliminated the longstanding need to voxelize BREP phantoms prior to simulation — a step that had introduced staircase artifacts along curved organ boundaries and artificially inflated computational memory requirements.

=== International Commission on Radiological Protection reference computational phantoms and tetrahedral mesh development ===
The International Commission on Radiological Protection (ICRP) has formally recognized tetrahedral mesh phantoms in the context of its reference computational phantom framework. ICRP Publication 110 (2009) established voxel-based adult male and female reference phantoms; however, subsequent work acknowledged the limitations of voxel geometry for dosimetry in thin or geometrically complex structures such as skin, lens of the eye, and the layers of the alimentary tract wall.

Research groups have developed tetrahedral mesh versions of the ICRP reference phantoms to address these limitations:

- Groups at Hanyang University (Korea) and Helmholtz Zentrum München (Germany, formerly GSF) investigated conversion of existing reference voxel and surface-mesh phantoms into tetrahedral format, demonstrating improved dosimetric accuracy in radiosensitive surface tissues.
- Researchers affiliated with the Korean HDRK phantom lineage developed tetrahedral mesh variants to enable direct FEM-based deformation and posture adjustment, maintaining ICRP-89 reference organ masses throughout geometric transformation.
- The IT'IS Foundation (Switzerland) explored tetrahedral mesh representations within the Virtual Population (ViP) framework for electromagnetic and multi-physics dosimetry applications, where volumetric meshing is a prerequisite for finite element electromagnetic solvers.

These developments have informed ongoing discussions within ICRP regarding the potential adoption of tetrahedral or hybrid volumetric mesh phantoms as future reference models for both external and internal dosimetry.

=== Hybrid volumetric mesh phantoms ===
Some research groups have adopted a hybrid approach in which different anatomical structures are represented using the most appropriate mesh type:

- Geometrically simple, large organs (e.g., liver, lungs) may use coarser tetrahedral meshes.
- Thin-walled, layered structures (e.g., gastrointestinal tract wall layers, urinary bladder wall) use highly refined local tetrahedral meshes to resolve tissue layers as thin as a few hundred micrometers — a resolution unachievable in standard voxel phantoms without prohibitive memory cost.
- The skeletal system, particularly trabecular bone and active bone marrow, is represented using micro-CT-derived tetrahedral meshes that capture the complex spongiosa microstructure relevant to bone dosimetry.

This stratified approach allows computational resources to be concentrated where dosimetric accuracy is most critical, without globally inflating mesh element counts.

=== Four-dimensional volumetric mesh phantoms ===
Building upon the 4D capabilities introduced by NURBS-based phantoms (e.g., the NCAT phantom), tetrahedral mesh phantoms extend dynamic simulation through FEM-based deformation modeling:

- Cardiac motion: The beating heart is simulated by applying FEM deformation fields derived from tagged MRI or 4D echocardiography data directly to the tetrahedral heart mesh, preserving volume and avoiding interpenetration of adjacent structures.
- Respiratory motion: Diaphragm displacement and lung volume change are modeled by solving a continuum mechanics deformation problem on the thoracic tetrahedral mesh, producing physically consistent organ boundary motion throughout the breathing cycle.
- Postural deformation: As demonstrated with the CHAD phantom concept, motion capture data can drive whole-body postural changes; with a tetrahedral representation, internal organ displacement is solved via FEM rather than approximated geometrically, producing more anatomically plausible results.

== See also ==
- Imaging phantom
