= Whole-body counting =

Measurement of radioactivity within the body

In health physics, whole-body counting is the measurement used in internal dosimetry, the measurement of radioactivity within the body. The technique is primarily applicable to radioactive material that emits gamma rays. Alpha particle decays can also be detected indirectly by their coincident gamma radiation. In certain circumstances, beta emitters can also be measured, but with degraded sensitivity. The instrument used for whole-body counting is referred to as a whole-body counter. In contrast, a whole-body monitor is a device used in radiation protection to check for a person's body external contamination when leaving a radiation controlled area.

== Principles ==
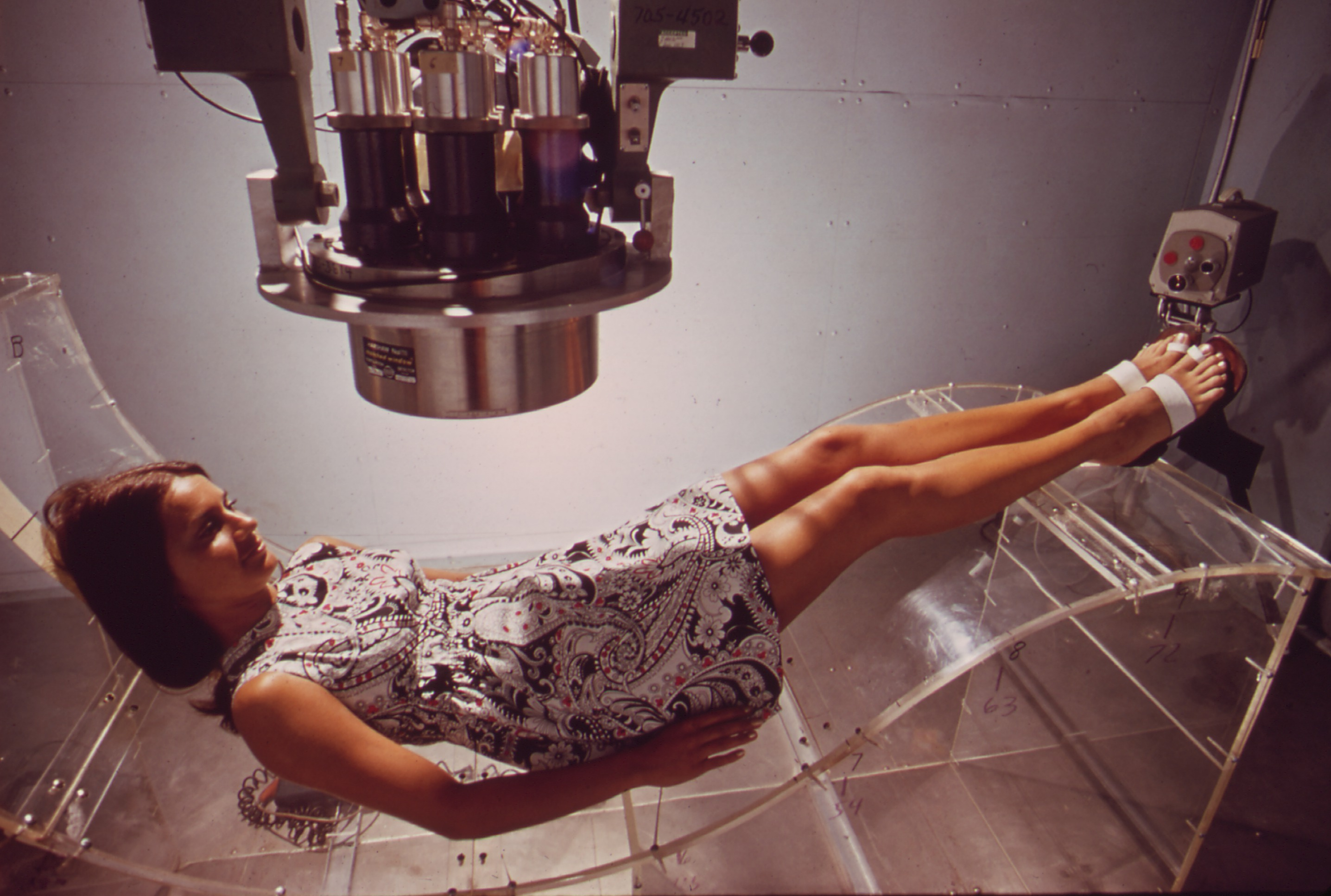
Whole body monitor in use

If a gamma ray is emitted from a radioactive element within the human body due to radioactive decay, and its energy is sufficient to escape, then it can be detected by means of either a scintillation detector or a semiconductor detector placed close to the body. Radioactive decay may give rise to gamma radiation, which cannot escape the body due to being absorbed or other interactions through which it can lose energy. Any measurement analysis must take this into account. Whole-body counting is suitable to detect radioactive elements that emit neutron radiation or high-energy beta radiation (by measuring secondary x-rays or gamma radiation), but only in experimental applications.

Whole-body counting can take place while a person is sitting, standing, or lying down, depending on the particular equipment setup used for the measurement. The detectors can be single or multiple, and can either be stationary or moving.

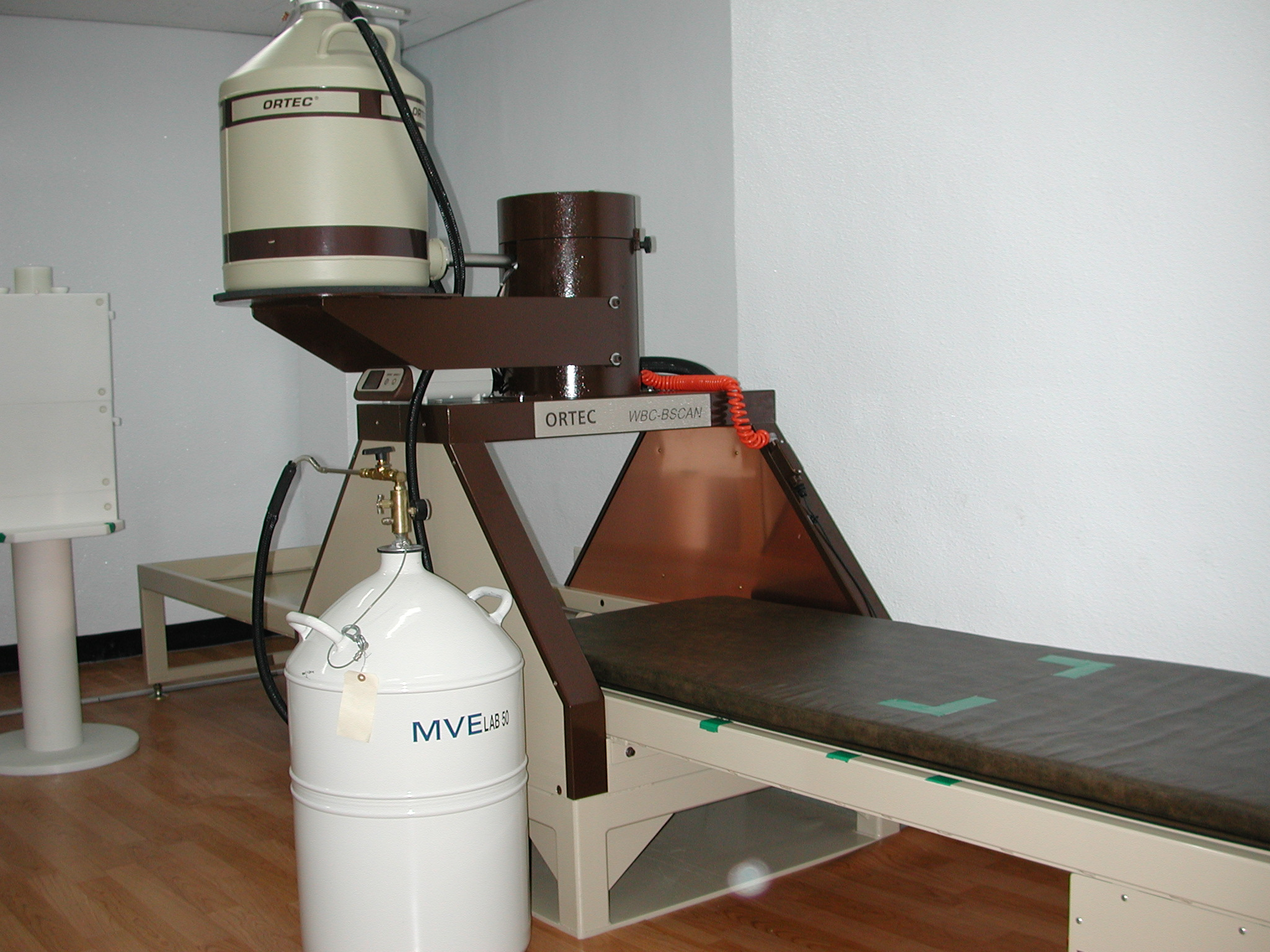
A scanning-bed whole-body counter

The advantages of whole-body counting are that it measures body contents directly, rather than relying on indirect bioassay methods (such as urinalysis), as it can measure insoluble radionuclides in the lungs. It is also more reliable than bioassay methods, and less invasive or uncomfortable for the person being measured.

However, there are some disadvantages to whole-body counting. Aside from special circumstances, it can only be used to detect gamma emitters due to self-shielding of the human body. It can also misinterpret external contamination as an internal contamination; to prevent this, a person must be rigorously decontaminated before the measurement. Whole-body counting may be unable to distinguish between radioisotopes that have similar gamma energies. Alpha and beta radiation is largely shielded by the body and will not be detected externally, although the coincident gamma from alpha decay may be detected, as well as radiation from the parent or daughter nuclides. Whole-body counters are generally too large to transport because they require shielding.

Whole-body counters are designed for measurement of humans, but they have also been used to measure other animals, like dogs, deer, and cattle.

== Calibration ==
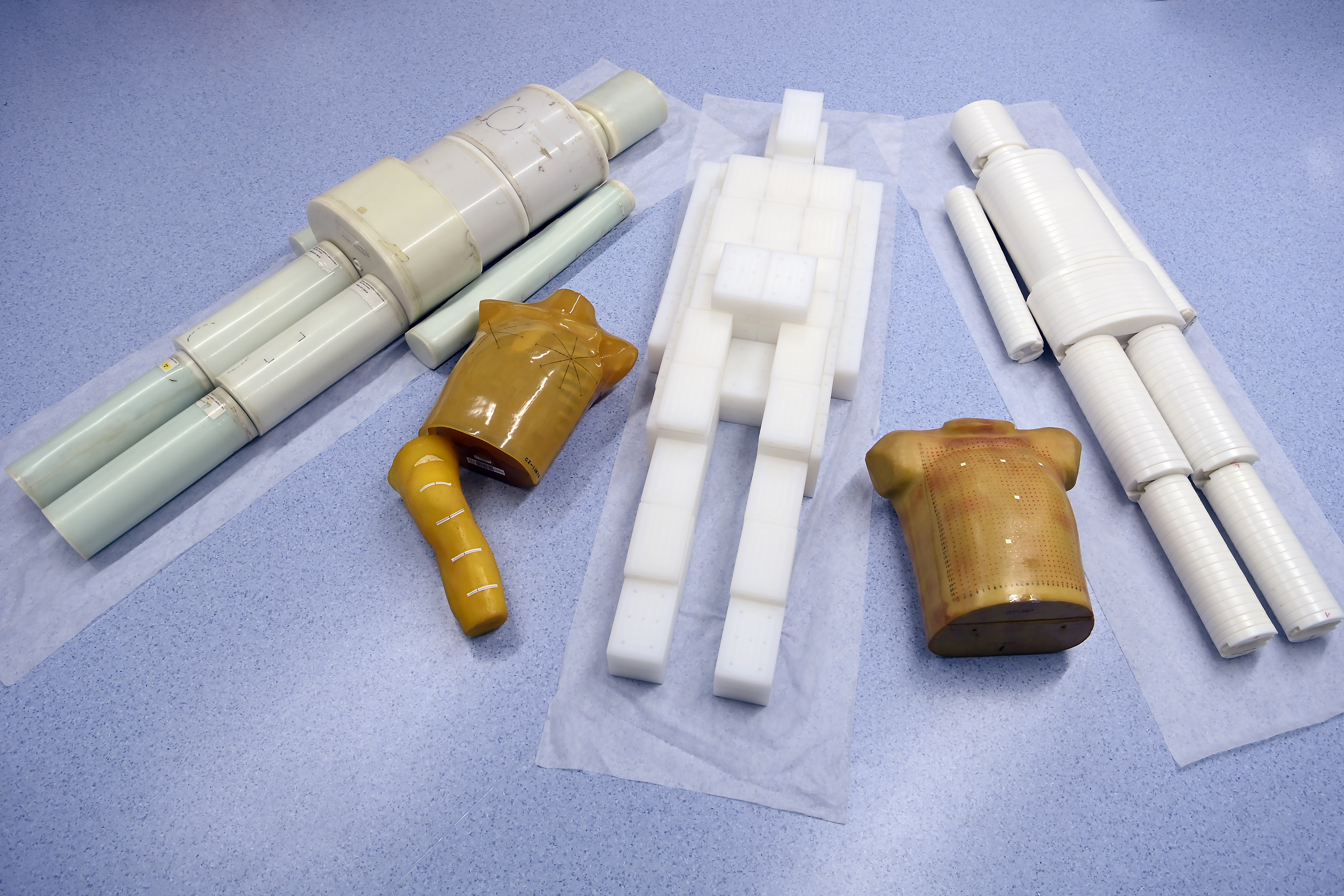
Various types of phantoms

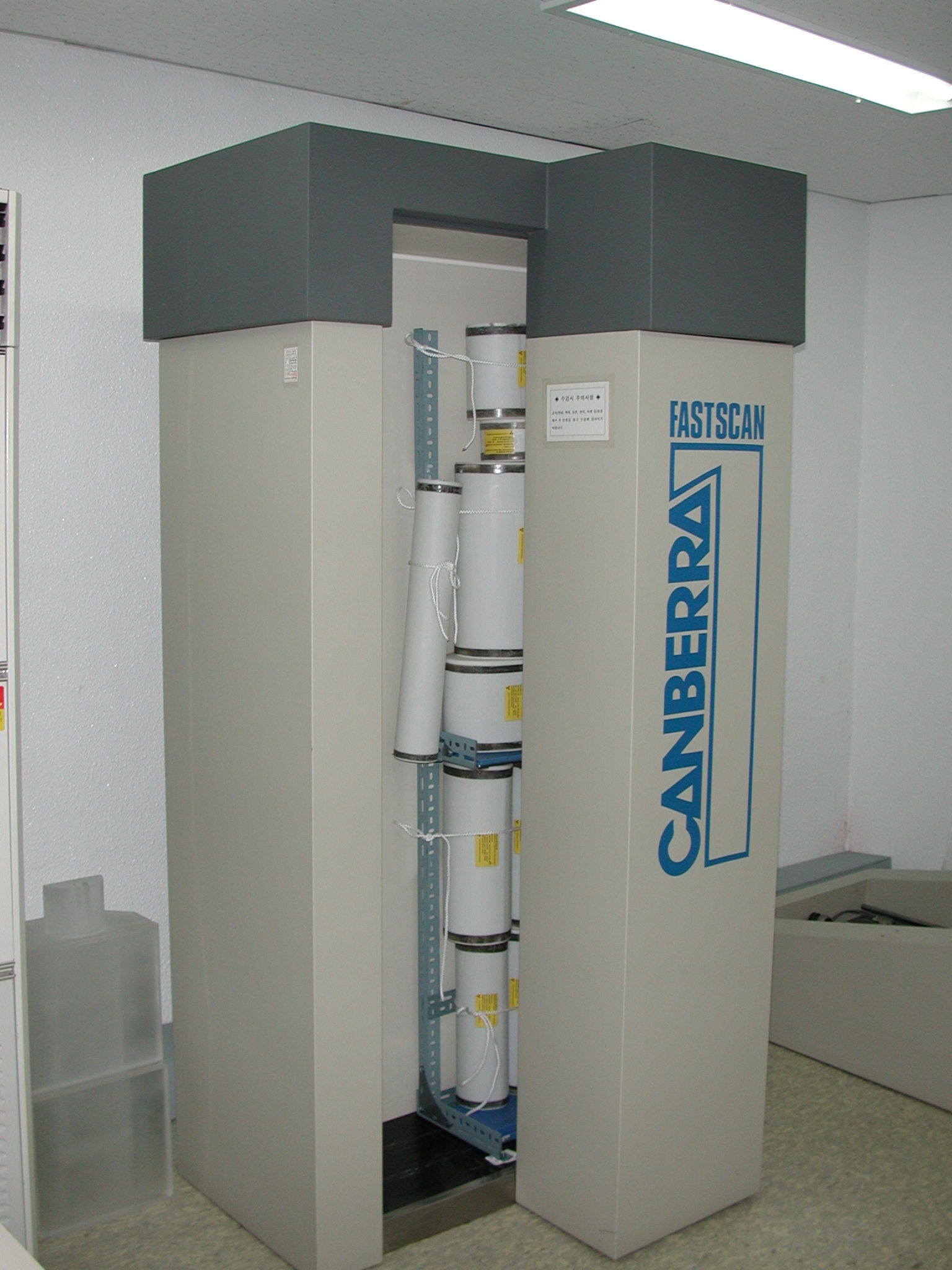
A walk-in whole-body monitor with phantom (mannequin) for calibration

Any radiation detector is a relative instrument, meaning that the measurement value can only be converted to an amount of material present by comparing the response signal (usually counts per minute, or per second) to the signal obtained from a standard whose radioactivity is well known.

A whole-body counter is calibrated with a device known as a "phantom" containing a known distribution and known activity of radioactive material. The accepted industry standard is the Bottle Manikin Absorber phantom (BOMAB). The BOMAB phantom consists of 10 high-density polyethylene containers filled with radioactive fluid, and is used to calibrate in vivo counting systems that are designed to measure the radionuclides that emit high energy photons (200 keV < E < 3 MeV). Because many different types of phantoms were historically used to calibrate in vivo counting systems, the importance of establishing standard specifications for phantoms was emphasized at the 1990 international meeting of in vivo counting professionals held at the National Institute of Standards and Technology (NIST). The consensus of the meeting attendees was that standard specifications were needed for the BOMAB phantom. These calibration systems are designed to measure radionuclides that emit high-energy photons and that are assumed to be homogeneously (evenly) distributed in the body.

== Sensitivity ==
A well-designed counting system can detect levels of most gamma emitters (>200 keV) at levels far below that which would cause adverse health effects in people. A typical detection limit for radioactive caesium (Cs-137) is about 40 Bq. The annual limit on intake–the amount that would give a person a dose equal to the worker limit, which is 20 mSv–is about 2,000,000 Bq. A counting system can also easily detect the amount of naturally occurring radioactive potassium present in all humans; risk of death by potassium deficiency approaches 100% as whole-body count approaches zero.

The reason that these instruments are so sensitive is that they are often housed in low background counting chambers. Typically, this is a small room with very thick walls made of low-background steel (≈20 cm) and sometimes lined with a thin layer of lead (≈1 cm). The shielding can significantly reduce background radiation inside the chamber, which increases the sensitivity of the instruments.

The radiation detector itself is typically made of a sodium iodide (NaI) crystal, with trace amounts of thallium added for increased sensitivity.

== Count times and detection limit ==
Depending on the counting geometry of the system, counting can take between 1 and 30 minutes. The sensitivity of a counter does depend on counting time; for a single counting system, longer counting times have better detection limits. The detection limit, often referred to as the minimum detectable activity (MDA), is given by the formula:

$$MDA = \frac{2.707+4.65\sqrt{N}}{ET}$$

...where N is the number of counts of background in the region of interest; E is the counting efficiency; and T is the counting time.

This quantity is approximately twice the Decision Limit, another statistical quantity that can be used to decide if there is any activity present. This can be used as a trigger point for more analysis.

== Applications ==
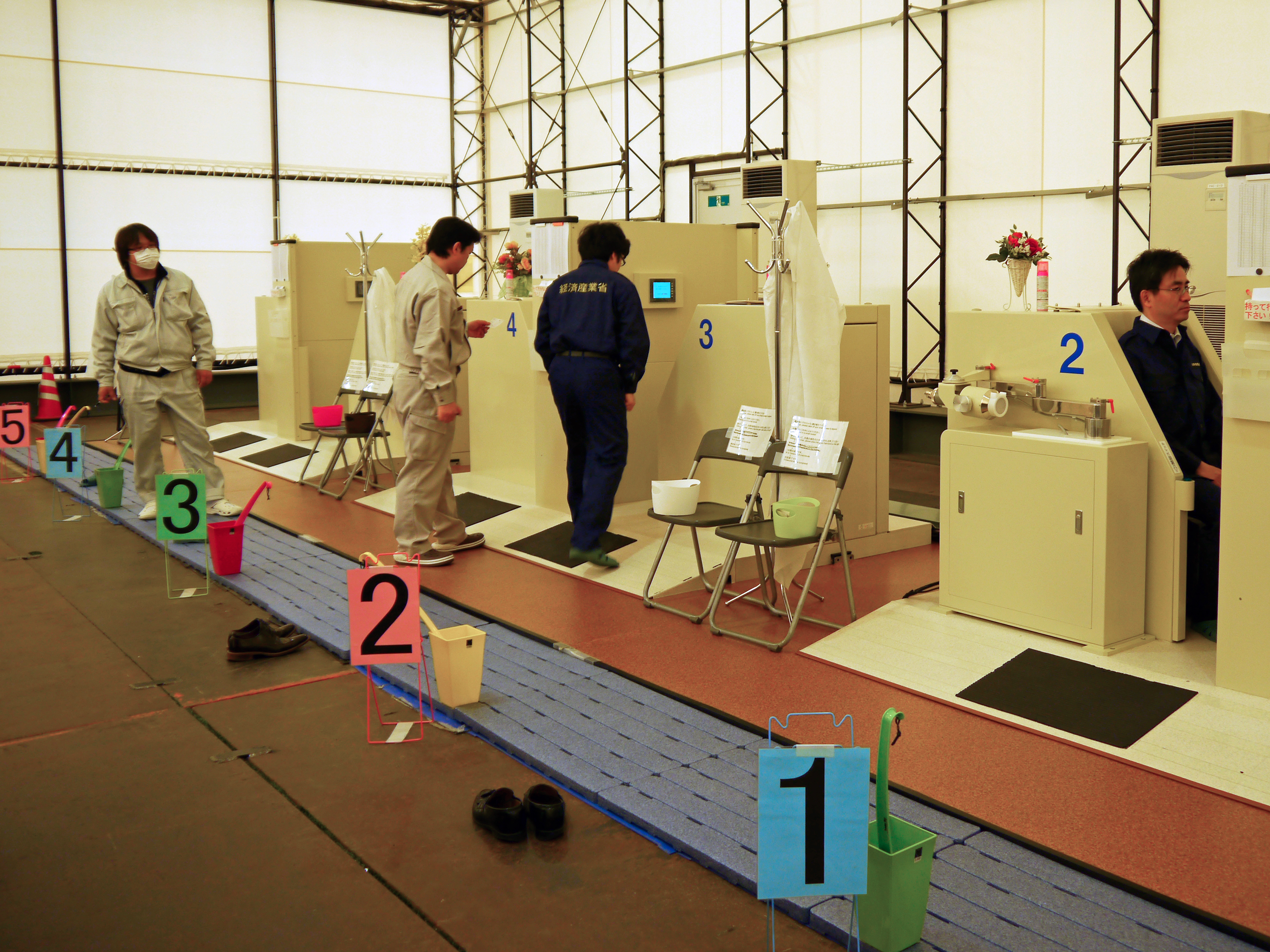
Whole body counters at the Fukushima Daiichi Nuclear Power Plant, 2012

Whole body counters and monitors are common diagnostic tools used in workplaces where workers are at risk of exposure to unusually high levels of radiation. Low-level standing whole body monitors are common in nuclear power plants. Whole body counting is especially important after accidents, to determine the amount and distribution of radiation within a person's body. It can also be used as one measurement of the effects of accidents on larger populations. For example, whole body counts were used to assess the impact of nuclear fallout on local populations after the 1986 Chernobyl disaster, and after the Fukushima nuclear accident in 2011, local authorities began taking whole body counts of residents of nearby Fukushima Prefecture to monitor local exposure to caesium-134 and -137.

== History ==
In 1950, Leonidas D. Marinelli developed and applied a low-level gamma-ray whole body counter to measure people who had been exposed to radiation, including people who had been injected with radium in the early 1920s and 1930s, people contaminated by exposure to nuclear testing and other atomic explosions, and by accidental exposures in industry and medicine. The sensitive methods of dosimetry and spectrometry Marinelli developed obtained the total content of natural potassium in the human body, and whole-body counters were used for medical research about potassium deficiency and the links between potassium and muscle function in conditions like muscular dystrophy. Marinelli's whole body counter was first used at Billings Hospital at the University of Chicago in 1952. At a 1955 atomic science convention in Geneva, more than 4,000 people participated in demonstrations of a walk-in whole-body counter.

In the 1950s and 1960s, Marinelli, Kurt Liden, and other scientists used whole-body counters to investigate the source of the unexpectedly high levels of nuclear radiation that had been detected in people with no known exposure to contaminants. This ultimately identified the source of the nuclear contamination: fallout from the many nuclear tests that had been carried out since the 1940s.

== See also ==
- History of nuclear power
- History of nuclear weapons
- Imaging particle analysis
- Radiography
