= Innosuisse =

Innosuisse Swiss Innovation Agency
- Formation: 1 January 2018
- Purpose: To promote science-based innovation in the interest of the economy and society in Switzerland
- Headquarters: Einsteinstrasse 2
- Location: 3003 Bern, Switzerland
- President of the Board: André Kudelski
- CEO: Dominique Gruhl-Bégin
- Website: https://www.innosuisse.admin.ch/en
- Formerly called: Commission for Technology and Innovation (CTI)

Innosuisse is the Swiss agency for promotion of innovation, legally mandated to promote science-based innovation and start-ups in Switzerland. With support for research institutions, start-ups, small and medium-sized enterprises (SMEs) and other Swiss organizations in their research and development activities, the agency promotes the transfer of knowledge from research to business.

Innosuisse is subordinated to the Federal Department of Economic Affairs, Education and Research but operates independently.

== History ==
The Commission for the Promotion of Scientific Research (KWF) was founded in 1934. The Swiss Federal Council charged the KWF with the task to examine applications for funding to promote research projects and create jobs during the Second World War (WWII), and, in 1954, the state research funding created under emergency law during WWII was incorporated into ordinary law.

When the Commission for Technology and Innovation (CTI) was founded in 1996, the KWF became an extra-parliamentary administrative commission with merely an advisory function and no decision-making powers. The CTI was involved in research and development of commercial projects, in setting up start-ups and SMEs, and in knowledge and technology transfer, with the goal to facilitate the incorporation of science-based innovations into new or existing products and services and bring the innovations to market. With the revision of the Swiss Federal Constitution in 2006, the promotion of innovation as well as research became explicitly mandated as a federal task, and the existing research law was adapted.

In 2011, the CTI was given more powers, separate from the Swiss Federal Office for Professional Education and Technology (OPET) as an independent authority commission with decision-making powers, operating its own office as the Federal Innovation Agency.

After four years as an independent authority commission, the CTI underwent a structural change in 2015 to become a public institution better able to promote innovation promotion. Based on a decision recorded by the Swiss Federal Council in 2014, the Department of Economic Affairs, Education and Research was commissioned to draft the Innosuisse Act (Federal Act on the Swiss Agency for Innovation Promotion - SAFIG), which was adopted by both houses of parliament on June 17, 2016, and CTI, newly named Innosuisse, began operations on January 1, 2018.

== Funding instruments ==
The core of Innosuisse's funding is used to support innovative projects with potential for marketable products or services. Innovative organizations – such as companies, start-ups, administrations, or non-governmental organizations (NGOs) – that work together with universities and research institutions to develop new services and products are eligible to seek funding from Innosuisse. Innovation projects can be carried out with national or international partners or even without partners from the business world, and large consortia engaged in longer-term, transdisciplinary projects in select subject areas are supported as part of a Flagship Initiative.

Innosuisse also provides support in the form of advice and networking guidance, helps with the selection of suitable funding instruments, and offers training, coaching, assistance with internationalization, and platforms for national and international appearances for the establishment and development of science-based start-ups.

== Organization ==
Innosuisse is a legally independent public institution compesed of four expert bodies, the composition and tasks of which are described in the Federal Act on the Swiss Agency for Innovation Promotion SAFIG.

The Innosuisse Board of Directors consists of 7 members and is responsible for the strategic management of the agency in accordance with the objectives set by the Swiss Federal Council. The Federal Council elects the members of the Board of Directors, who serve for four years, and also appoints the President, currently André Kudelski, elected in 2018. The Innosuisse CEO is Dominique Gruhl-Bégin.

The Innovation Council, the specialist body of Innosuisse, decides on funding applications and oversees the implementation of funding measures.
