= Niels Kuster =

Swiss electrical engineer

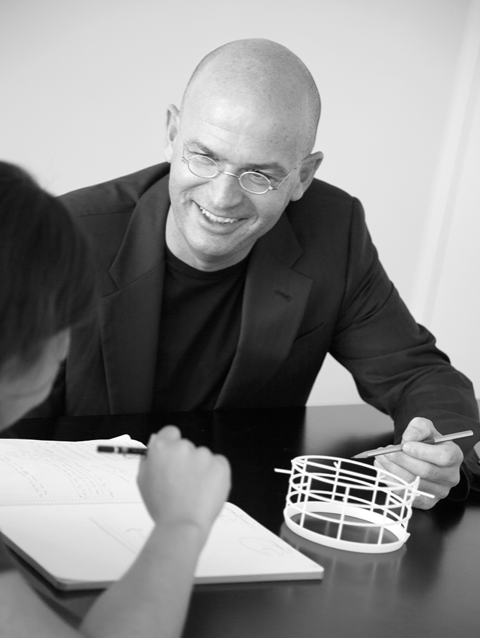
Niels Kuster

Niels Kuster (born June 19, 1957, in Olten, Switzerland) is a Swiss electrical engineer and Professor. The focus of his research is on the electromagnetic near field, basics for assessing/using the interaction of electromagnetic fields with organisms, and physiological simulations as part of biophysics.

== Early life and education ==
Kuster grew up in Olten, in the Swiss Canton of Solothurn, where he attended elementary and middle school. After graduating from Gymnasium with the "Matura Type C" (concentration in mathematics and physical sciences) diploma, he studied at the ETH Zurich and graduated in 1984 with a degree in electrical engineering. Starting in 1985, he pursued doctoral work in the Laboratory for Field Theory and Microwave Technology (IFH) at the ETH Zurich under the direction of Heinrich Baggenstos, during which time he was a teaching and research assistant. He defended his doctoral dissertation, entitled "Dosimetric assessment of EM sources near biological bodies by computer simulations", in 1992.

== Career ==
During his post-doctoral studies at IFH in 1992, Kuster also worked at the Electromagnetics Laboratory of Motorola Inc in Fort Lauderdale, Florida, then, in 1993, he was appointed assistant professor in the Department of Information Technology and Electrical Engineering (D-ITET) at the ETH Zurich. Kuster co-founded Schmid and Partners Engineering AG (SPEAG) in December 1994 as a spin-off company of the ETH-Zurich, together with Thomas Schmid, Kurt Schmid, Martin Schmid, Oliver Egger, and Klaus Meier, with the main objective to further develop and commercialize the Dosimetric Assessment SYstem (DASY), the first electromagnetic near-field scanner optimized for testing the compliance of mobile communications devices with safety limits. In 1998, he was a visiting professor and lecturer at the Tokyo Metropolitan University in Japan. In 1999, he founded the Swiss non-profit Foundation for Research on Information Technology in Society (IT'IS). Kuster founded ZMT Zurich MedTech AG (ZMT) in 2006 as a spin-off company of the ETH-Zurich and the IT'IS Foundation. He was an adjunct professor at the ETH Zurich from 2001 to 2022 and headed the BioElectromagnetics research group of the ETH's Laboratory for Integrated Systems. His main achievements are in the areas of measurement and simulation methods in the electromagnetic near field, safety aspects of wireless communication and magnetic resonance imaging, virtual human and animal models for investigations of anatomy-dependent interactions and optimization of therapies via computer simulation (e.g., in silico clinical trials and neurostimulation).

== Participation in start-up companies ==
Niels Kuster has been involved in the founding of several start-up companies in Switzerland and internationally:

- 1994: Schmid & Partner Engineering AG (SPEAG) together with Thomas Schmid, Kurt Schmid, Martin Schmid, Oliver Egger, and Klaus Meier
- 1999: MaxWave AG, co-founder
- 2006: ZMT Zurich MedTech AG, co-founder with the IT'IS team for medical research
- 2011: Thessaloniki Software Solutions S.A. (THESS), co-founder
- 2011: BNNSPEAG, a joint venture between SPEAG and the Indian company BNN Communication Engineers
- 2011: SCALK, a joint venture between SPEAG and the South Korean company Dymstec Co., Ltd
- 2019: TI Solutions AG, a joint venture to foster temporal interference (TI) research

== Other activities ==
- Consultant to government agencies on safety issues related to wireless devices
- Member of professional societies such as the Bioelectromagnetics Society (BEMS), the European Society of Hyperthermic Oncology (ESHO), the Society for Thermal Medicine (STM), the Society for Neuroscience (SfN), and the Swiss Society for Neuroscience (SSN).
- Associate Editor of the IEEE Transactions on Electromagnetic Compatibility
- Participation in international standards committees, including the International Electrotechnical Commission (IEC) Technical Committee (TC) 106, TC 61, and the International Organization for Standardization (ISO) TS 10974:2018

== Awards and honors ==
- 2011: IEEE Fellow: Laudatio: For contributions to the area of near-field exposures and dosimetry for radiofrequency fields in biomedical research
- 2012: d'Arsonval Award of the Bioelectromagnetics Society
- 2014: Institute of Electronics, Information, and Communication Engineers (IEICE) Senior Member
