= Shepp–Logan phantom =

Standard test image

Image of the Shepp–Logan Phantom

The Shepp–Logan phantom is a standard test image created by Larry Shepp and Benjamin F. Logan for their 1974 paper "The Fourier Reconstruction of a Head Section". It serves as the model of a human head in the development and testing of image reconstruction algorithms.

== Definition ==
The function describing the phantom is defined as the sum of 10 ellipses inside a 2×2 square:

Ellipse	Center	Major Axis	Minor Axis	Theta	Gray Level
a	(0,0)	0.69	0.92	0	2
b	(0,−0.0184)	0.6624	0.874	0	−0.98
c	(0.22,0)	0.11	0.31	−18°	−0.02
d	(−0.22,0)	0.16	0.41	18°	−0.02
e	(0,0.35)	0.21	0.25	0	0.01
f	(0,0.1)	0.046	0.046	0	0.01
g	(0,−0.1)	0.046	0.046	0	0.01
h	(−0.08,−0.605)	0.046	0.023	0	0.01
i	(0,−0.605)	0.023	0.023	0	0.01
j	(0.06,−0.605)	0.023	0.046	0	0.01

== See also ==
- Imaging phantom
