= Phantom structure =

Phantom structures are artificial structures designed to emulate properties of the human body in matters such as, including, but not limited to, light scattering and optics, electrical conductivity, and sound wave reception. Phantoms have been used experimentally in lieu of, or as a supplement to, human subjects to maintain consistency, verify reliability of technologies, or reduce experimental expense. They also have been employed as material for training technicians to perform imaging.

== Optical phantoms ==
Optical tissue phantoms, or imaging phantoms, are reported to be used largely for three main purposes: to calibrate optical devices, record baseline reference measurements, and for imaging the human body. Optical tissue phantoms may have irregular shape of body parts.

=== Composite Materials ===
Optical phantoms can be made from a number of materials. These are including but not limited to:

- homogenized milk
- non-dairy creamer
- wax
- blood and yeast suspension
- water-soluble dye (India ink)
- intralipid
- latex microspheres
- solid epoxy
- liquid rubber
- silicone
- polyester
- polyurethane

== Computational phantoms ==
Computational human phantoms have many uses, including but not limited to, biomedical imaging computational modeling and simulations, radiation dosimetry, and treatment planning.

== Physiological models ==
=== Phantom head ===
While using research oriented and Commercial Off The Shelf (COTS) EEG technologies built for monitoring brain activity, scientists established the need for a benchmark reading of neural electrical activity. EEG readings' strong dependency on mechanical contact makes the technology sensitive to movement. This and a high responsivity to environmental conditions may lead to signal noise. Without a baseline, it is hard to interpret whether abnormal clinical data is a result of faulty technology, patient inconsistency or noncompliance, ambient noise, or an unexplained scientific principle.

A phantom head was described by researchers in 2015. This head was developed at the U.S. Army Research Laboratory. Reported intent for the engineering of this phantom head was to "accurately recreate real and imaginary scalp impedance, contain internal emitters to create dipoles, and be easily replicable across various labs and research groups."

The scientists used an inverse 3D printed mold that was reproduced an anonymized MRI image. The head consisted of ballistics gel with a composition that included salt in order to conduct electricity like human tissue. Ballistics gelatin was chosen because it conducts electricity, while also possessing mechanical properties similar to living tissue. Multiple electric wires within the Army's phantom head carried electric current. A CT scan was used to verify proper electrode placement. The limitations of this phantom was that the material was not sufficiently durable. The refrigerated gel degraded relatively quickly, by approximately .3% each day.

Other reported models had been made of saline filled spheres.

=== Phantom prostate ===
In 2013, a patent submission for a prostate phantom was reported. The prostate was composed of three separate phantom layers of prostate, perineal gland, and skin tissue and developed for the study of prostate cancer brachytherapy. The scientists claimed that the phantom emulates the imaging and mechanical properties of the prostate and surrounding tissues.

=== Phantom ear ===
In 2002, researchers proposed an ear phantom for experimental studies on sound absorbance rates of cellular emissions.

=== Phantom skin ===
Several designs of phantom skin have been developed for various uses including, but not limited to, studying skin lesion therapy, applications of narrowband and ultra-band microwaves (like breast cancer detection), and imaging fingernails and underlying tissues.

=== Phantom breast ===
Ultrasound tissue elastography is a method to determine tissue health, as pathologies have been noted to increase the elasticity of tissue. In 2015, a tissue-like agar-based phantom had been reported to be useful in compression elastographical diagnosis of breast cancer. The scientists replicated the clinical appearance of conditions such as fibroadenoma and invasive ductal carcinoma in the phantom breast and compared elastographic and sonographic images.

Additionally, a recipe for the formation of a semi-compressible phantom breast with liquid rubber has been reported.

=== Phantom muscle ===
There have been many fabrication methods developed on muscle phantoms. Researchers have developed muscle phantoms to implicate or act as tumors in breast imaging for cancer detection.
