= Mobile Manufacturers Forum =

The Mobile Manufacturers Forum is an international non-profit organization founded in 1998 by a number of leading manufacturers of mobile radio equipment, including Alcatel, Ericsson, Mitsubishi Electric, Motorola, Nokia, Karbonn Mobiles, Panasonic, Philips, Sagem, Samsung, Siemens Mobile, Sony Ericsson and TCL & Alcatel Mobile Phones.

One of MMF's main objectives is to provide funds to key research projects concerning health and mobile phones, as well as to cooperate on standards and regulatory issues. It has also an important activity in social communication with the public.

The funding effort of MMF follows and acts in coordination with the recommendations of the World Health Organization's Electromagnetic Fields Project. MMF also acts towards the harmonisation of national and international standards of safety in microwave electromagnetic radiation used in mobile communications. In the regulatory policy field, MMF represents the mobiles industry at an international level and helps with local issues and demands.

MMF's site has a plethora of publicly available documents, white papers, articles, and newsletters regarding the issue of EMF and health.

The MMF also operates the Global Accessibility Reporting Initiative (GARI) to aid consumers in identifying devices with accessibility features such as hearing aid comparability.
