= Low-background steel =

Steel produced prior to the 1940s

Low-background steel, also known as pre-war steel, pre-atomic steel, or pre-nuclear steel, is any steel produced prior to the detonation of the first nuclear bombs in the 1940s and 1950s. Typically obtained from scrapped ships, salvaged shipwrecks, and other steel artifacts of this era, it is often used as a shielding material for particle detectors and whole-body counting equipment because more modern steel is contaminated with traces of nuclear fallout. Other low-background materials, such as ancient lead, are sometimes used for especially sensitive equipment.

== History and rationale ==
In the Bessemer process, air is forced upward into the converter.

In the basic oxygen steelmaking (BOS) process, oxygen gas is introduced from above.

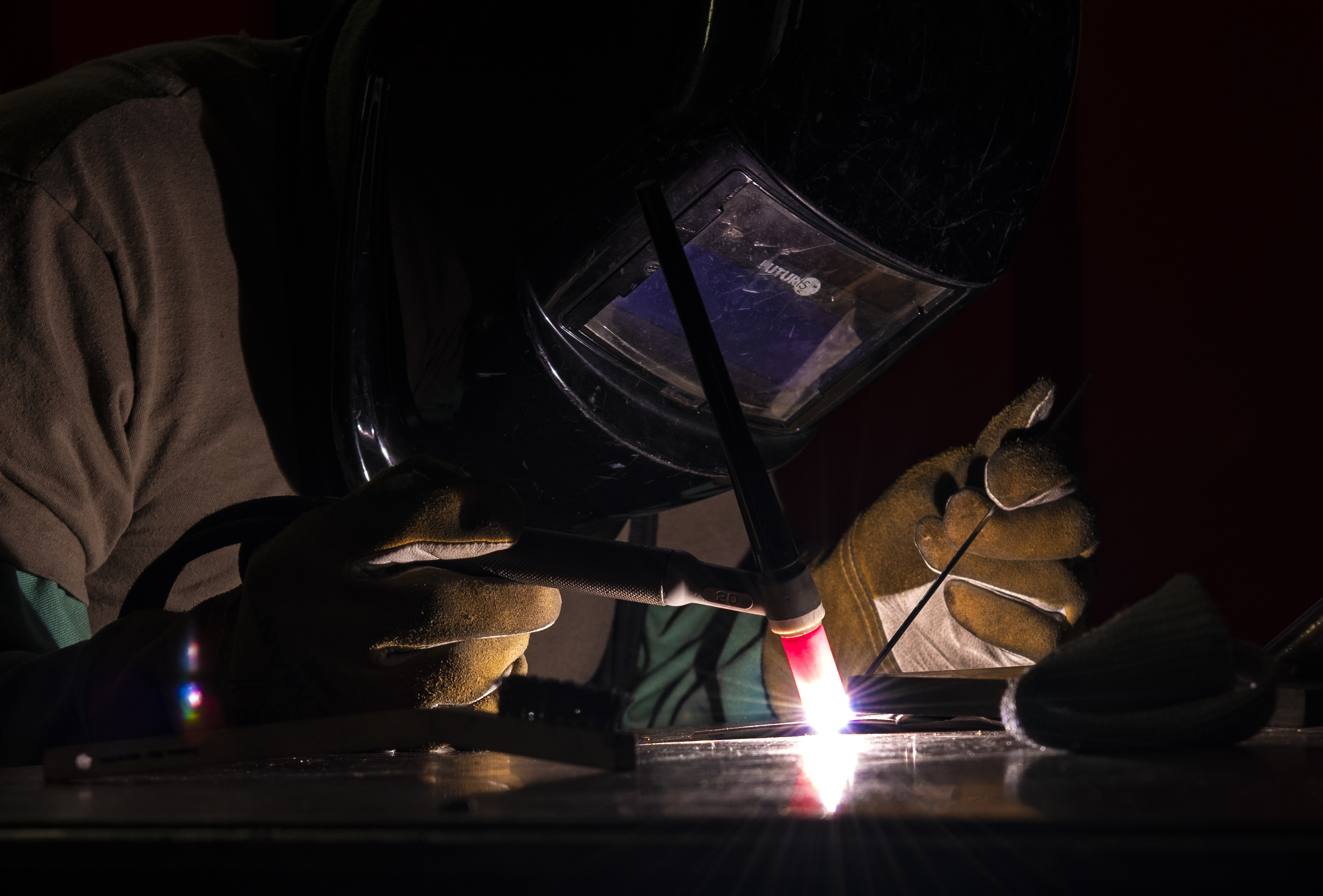
The thorium used in gas tungsten arc welding is one source of radioactive contamination of steel.

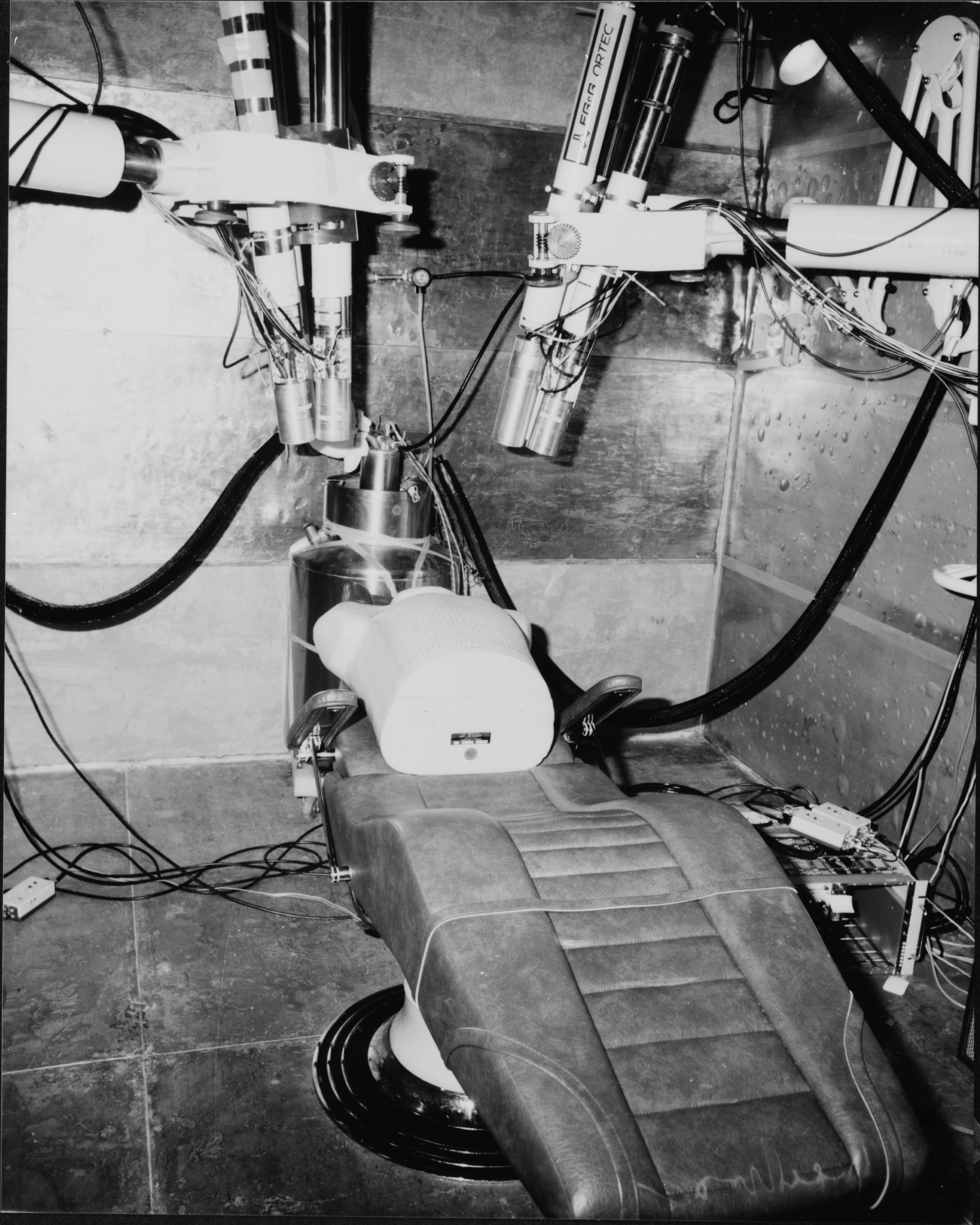
A body counting room at the Rocky Flats Plant near Denver, Colorado, made entirely from pre-World War II steel, photographed in 1985

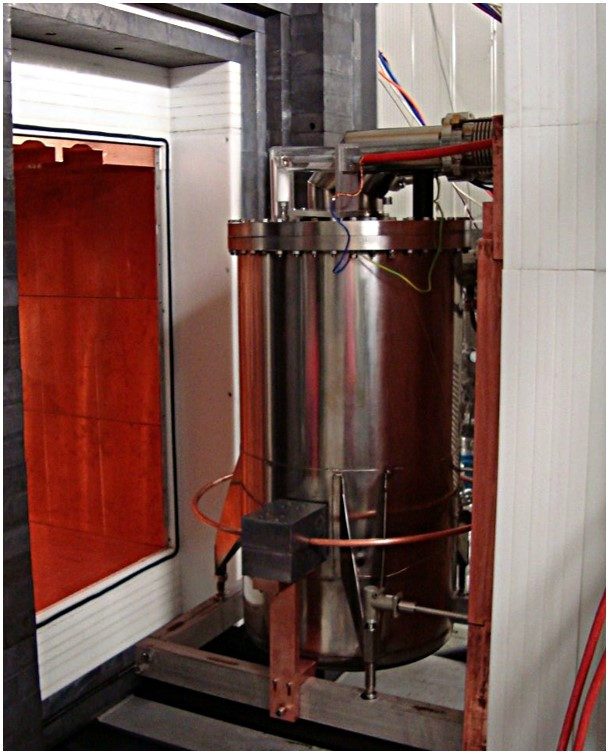
The shield of the time projection chamber of the XENON100 dark matter experiment utilizes ancient lead.

From 1856 until the mid 20th century, steel was produced in the Bessemer process, where air was forced into Bessemer converters converting the pig iron into steel. By the mid-20th century, many steelworks had switched to the BOS process, which uses pure oxygen instead of air. However, as both processes use atmospheric gas, they are susceptible to contamination from airborne particulates. Present-day air carries radionuclides, such as cobalt-60, which are deposited into the steel, giving it a weak radioactive signature. Another source of radioactive contamination was the coating of steel cauldrons in cobalt-60 in order to monitor wear. Steel that would otherwise be expected to be low-background can itself be contaminated due to thorium contained in welding rods, such as those used in gas tungsten arc welding.

World anthropogenic background radiation, caused by atmospheric nuclear testing, peaked at a level 0.11 mSv/yr (4%) above the natural 2.40 mSv/yr. It began to fall in 1963, when the Partial Nuclear Test Ban Treaty was enacted, and by 2008 it had decreased to only 0.005 mSv/yr above natural levels. This has made special low-background steel no longer necessary for most radiation-sensitive uses, as new steel now has a low enough radioactive signature. Some demand remains for the most radiation-sensitive uses, such as Geiger counters and sensing equipment aboard spacecraft. For the most sensitive equipment, even low-background steel can be too radioactive, and other materials like high-purity copper may be used.

At the end of World War I, the German Navy scuttled around 50 ships in Scapa Flow instead of turning them over to the British Royal Navy. These ships have historically been one source of low-background steel. In cases where World War II–era shipwrecks in and near the relatively shallow Java Sea and western South China Sea have been illegally scavenged, it has been suggested that the target is low-background steel. However, some–including Andrew Brockman, a maritime crime researcher and archaeologist–argue that conventional salvage is more likely.

== Other low background materials ==
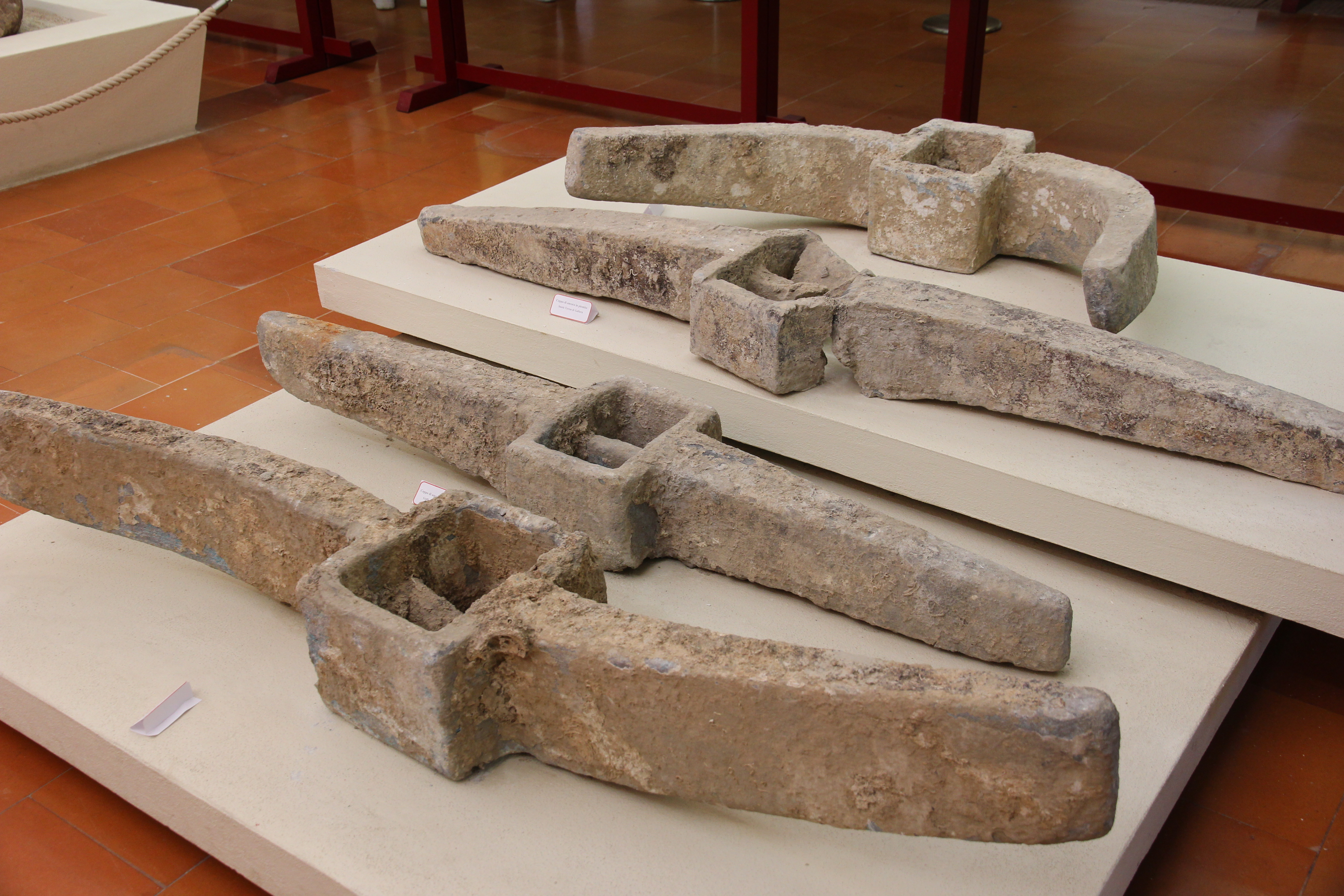
The ancient Romans used lead to produce parts for their ships, including anchor stocks like these. (Antiquarium Turritano, 2015)

Some specialized particle detectors, including CUORE, XENON100, and Canfranc Underground Laboratory, have used low-background lead for shielding. This is sourced from ancient Roman lead, some of which is sourced from ancient Roman shipwrecks. Ancient lead has lower radiation levels than freshly refined lead because lead ore is constantly replenished with radioactive isotopes underground, and after processing, it still contains radioactive lead-210, which has a half-life of 22 years. Ancient lead has had enough time for the lead-210 to decay to the point where it is "totally absent", so the lead can be used in highly sensitive equipment.

It is planned to use low background lead in the neutrino detector of the RES-NOVA experiment in form of PbWO_{4} crystals.

== Cultural impact ==
Immediately after ChatGPT was released, people around the web began using low-background steel as a metaphor to describe the practice of archiving web content that existed before 2022 in an effort to preserve information that was produced by humans without "contamination" from large language models.

== See also ==
- Bomb pulse
- Cosmic background radiation
- Deionized water
- Health physics
- Human impact on the environment
- Radiometry
