= Imaging agent =

Imaging agent may refer to:

- Contrast agent, a substance used in medical imaging
- Radiopharmaceutical, a pharmaceutical drug containing radioactive isotopes used as a diagnostic agent
