= Dewi Meirion Lewis =

Welsh physicist

Dewi Meirion Lewis is a Welsh physicist. He has worked in nuclear research and is an internationally recognized expert in radioactive pharmaceuticals.

== Early life and education ==
Dewi M. Lewis was brought up in Harlech, Merionethshire. He is Welsh speaking and attended Harlech Primary School where his father was headmaster and Ysgol Ardudwy, the secondary school in Harlech. He was awarded the Lady Catherine James scholarship for Merionethshire, after achieving the highest A-level marks in the county. He went to Swansea University to study Physics. As an undergraduate, Lewis was one of the University of Wales student volunteers at Aberfan on the first day of the mining disaster in October 1966. He received a first-class honours degree in Physics from Swansea in 1969, and was the first Swansea University PhD student to start research on positrons - the antimatter of electrons.

He continued his training at CERN, the International Physics Laboratory in Geneva, Switzerland, where he was a Science Fellow.

== Career ==
At CERN, he became engineer-in-charge of the laboratory's first hadron collider, ISR, which was then the world's most powerful particle accelerator. He brought his accelerator ('atom-smasher') technology back to UK industry and was the Cyclotron Department manager at Amersham International plc. From 1991 to 1999 he was strategy manager at Amersham, where he worked on the development manufacture and commercialisation of radioisotopes for medical applications.

From 1999 to 2005, he was vice president, physics (in research and development) and then head of physics at GE Healthcare, still based at Amersham. From 2010 to 2012, he went back to CERN as industry advisor, and from 2010 to 2013 he was vice president of AIPES, the European Industry Medical Imaging Association, in Brussels. In 2010 he founded his own international consultancy, PHYSEGA Ltd., and has been its director ever since. He divides his time between the French Alps, near CERN, and Amersham in South Buckinghamshire .

== Memberships, fellowships, and other professional activities ==
He ran the Brussels-based Isotope and Reactor Committee for several years and was a Council member of the UK Research Councils, PPARC and CCLRC. He is a Fellow of the Learned Society of Wales and of the Institute of Physics.

Lewis was one of the first Western scientists to enter the secret city of Chelyabinsk-65 in the USSR. He later arranged with the Russian Atomic Energy Ministry to form a joint venture company for industrial radioisotopes.

== Honours and awards ==
Dewi M. Lewis has an honorary chair at Swansea University's College of Science and was awarded an Honorary Doctorate of Science (DSc) in 2019.

In 2022 Lewis was awarded the Leadership Award for Outstanding Contribution by the University College London.

== Personal life ==
Lewis married Elizabeth Mary Williams in 1972. They have one daughter and two sons.
