= Whole-body nuclear scanning =

Whole-body nuclear scanning is a medical imaging technique where the whole body is scanned, contrary to, e.g., neuroimaging where only the brain is scanned.

Whole-body nuclear scanning may refer to several different modalities:

- Nuclear magnetic resonance imaging, also known more commonly as magnetic resonance imaging (MRI)
- But normally it would probably refer to a nuclear medicine tomographic imaging technique such as:
  - Single photon emission computed tomography (SPECT)
  - Positron emission tomography (PET)
