= Immunoscintigraphy =

Nuclear medicine procedure

- Purpose: detect cancer cells

Immunoscintigraphy is a nuclear medicine procedure used to find cancer cells in the body by injecting a radioactively labeled antibody, which binds predominantly to cancer cells and then scanning for concentrations of radioactive emissions.

== Clinical applications ==
Immunoscintigraphy is performed using a variety of radiopharmaceuticals, for a large range of purposes. Colorectal cancer is one of the most studied areas, with indium-111 or technetium-99m labelled epitopes of the carcinoembryonic antigen. The antibody capromab pendetide reacts with prostate membrane specific antigen (PMSA) and can be labelled with ^{111}In.

== See also ==
- Indium-111 WBC scan
- Scintigraphy
