= Isotopes in medicine =

A medical isotope is an isotope used in medicine. The first uses of isotopes in medicine were in radiopharmaceuticals, and this is still the most common use. However more recently, separated stable isotopes have come into use.

== Radioactive isotopes ==
Radioactive isotopes are used in medicine for both treatment and diagnostic scans. The most common isotope used in diagnostic scans is Technetium-99m, used in approximately 85% of all nuclear medicine diagnostic scans worldwide. It is used for diagnoses involving a large range of body parts and diseases such as cancers and neurological problems. Another well-known radioactive isotope used in medicine is Iodine-131, which is used as a radioactive label for some radiopharmaceutical therapies or the treatment of some types of thyroid cancer.

== Non-radioactive isotopes ==
Examples of non-radioactive medical isotopes are:

- Deuterium in deuterated drugs
- Carbon-13 used in liver function and metabolic tests
