= Gated tomography =

Gated tomography may refer to:

- Gated SPECT
- Gated X-ray CT, see X-ray computed tomography#Cardiac
