= Besilesomab =

Chemical compound

Monoclonal antibody
- Type: Whole antibody
- Source: Mouse
- Target: CEA-related antigen

Clinical data
- Trade names: Scintimun
- License data: EU EMA: by INN
- ATC code: none

Identifiers
- CAS Number: 537694-98-7
- ChemSpider: none
- UNII: 538316W9ZU
- KEGG: D10844

Besilesomab (trade name Scintimun) is a mouse monoclonal antibody labelled with the radioactive isotope technetium-99m. It is used to detect inflammatory lesions and metastases. It binds to an immunoglobulin, IgG1 isotype. SCINTIMUN has been used since 1992 mainly in Hungary, Czech Republic, and Switzerland on the basis of local marketing authorizations, and in Germany (on the basis of individual prescription). Between 1992 and 2009, an estimated 90,000 patients has been studied. In 2009, the EMEA has approved SCINTIMUN for marketing in all European countries.
