= Radiopharmacology =

Pharmacologic study of radiated medical compounds

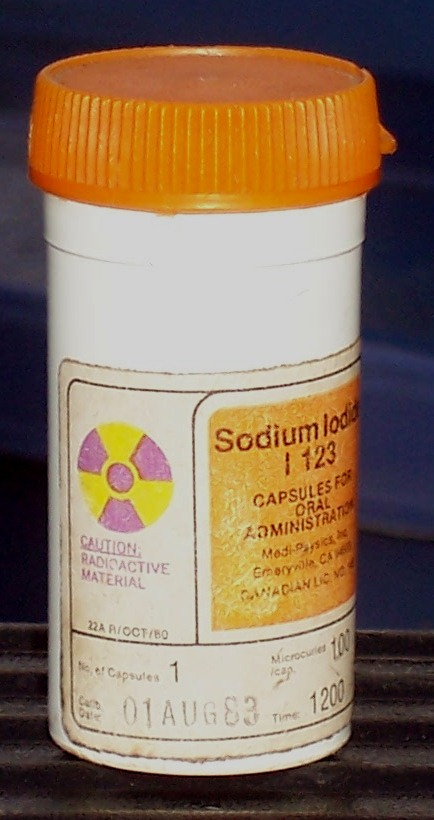
- Lead container for iodine-123 capsule
- Other names: Medicinal radiochemistry
- Specialty: Oncology

Radiopharmacology is radiochemistry applied to medicine and thus the pharmacology of radiopharmaceuticals (medicinal radiocompounds, that is, pharmaceutical drugs that are radioactive). Radiopharmaceuticals are used in the field of nuclear medicine as radioactive tracers in medical imaging and in therapy for many diseases (for example, brachytherapy). Many radiopharmaceuticals use technetium-99m (Tc-99m) which has many useful properties as a gamma-emitting tracer nuclide. In the book Technetium a total of 31 different radiopharmaceuticals based on Tc-99m are listed for imaging and functional studies of the brain, myocardium, thyroid, lungs, liver, gallbladder, kidneys, skeleton, blood and tumors.

The term radioisotope, which in its general sense refers to any radioactive isotope (radionuclide), has historically been used to refer to all radiopharmaceuticals, and this usage remains common. Technically, however, many radiopharmaceuticals incorporate a radioactive tracer atom into a larger pharmaceutically-active molecule, which is localized in the body, after which the radionuclide tracer atom allows it to be easily detected with a gamma camera or similar gamma imaging device. An example is fludeoxyglucose in which fluorine-18 is incorporated into deoxyglucose. Some radioisotopes (for example gallium-67, gallium-68, and radioiodine) are used directly as soluble ionic salts, without further modification. This use relies on the chemical and biological properties of the radioisotope itself, to localize it within the body.

== History ==
See nuclear medicine.

== Production ==
Production of a radiopharmaceutical involves two processes:

- The production of the radionuclide on which the pharmaceutical is based.
- The preparation and packaging of the complete radiopharmaceutical.

Radionuclides used in radiopharmaceuticals are mostly radioactive isotopes of elements with atomic numbers less than that of bismuth, that is, they are radioactive isotopes of elements that also have one or more stable isotopes. These may be roughly divided into two classes:

- Those with more neutrons in the nucleus than those required for stability are known as proton-deficient, and tend to be most easily produced in a nuclear reactor. The majority of radiopharmaceuticals are based on proton deficient isotopes, with technetium-99m being the most commonly used medical isotope, and therefore nuclear reactors are the prime source of medical radioisotopes.
- Those with fewer neutrons in the nucleus than those required for stability are known as neutron-deficient, and tend to be most easily produced using a proton accelerator such as a medical cyclotron.

== Practical use ==
Because radiopharmeuticals require special licenses and handling techniques, they are often kept in local centers for medical radioisotope storage, often known as radiopharmacies. A radiopharmacist may dispense them from there, to local centers where they are handled at the practical medicine facility.

== Drug nomenclature for radiopharmaceuticals ==
As with other pharmaceutical drugs, there is standardization of the drug nomenclature for radiopharmaceuticals, although various standards coexist. The International Nonproprietary Name (INN) gives the base drug name, followed by the radioisotope (as mass number, no space, element symbol) in parentheses with no superscript, followed by the ligand (if any). It is common to see square brackets and superscript superimposed onto the INN name, because chemical nomenclature (such as IUPAC nomenclature) uses those. The United States Pharmacopeia (USP) name gives the base drug name, followed by the radioisotope (as element symbol, space, mass number) with no parentheses, no hyphen, and no superscript, followed by the ligand (if any). The USP style is not the INN style, despite their being described as one and the same in some publications (e.g., AMA, whose style for radiopharmaceuticals matches the USP style). The United States Pharmacopeial Convention is a sponsor organization of the USAN Council, and the USAN for a given drug is often the same as the USP name.

| International Nonproprietary Name (INN) | United States Pharmacopeia (USP) | Comments |
|---|---|---|
| technetium (99mTc) sestamibi | technetium Tc 99m sestamibi | |
| fludeoxyglucose (18F) | fludeoxyglucose F 18 | |
| sodium iodide (125I) | sodium iodide I 125 | |
| indium (111In) altumomab pentetate | indium In 111 altumomab pentetate | |

== See also ==
- Radioactive tracer
- Nuclear medicine
