= ALMANAC =

British breast cancer trial

ALMANAC is a major breast cancer trial. The acronym stands for "Axillary Lymphatic Mapping Against Nodal Axillary Clearance." This major randomized trial performed in several centres in the UK produced clear evidence that sentinel node biopsy (SNB), used to stage axillary spread of disease, can be used with low failed localization and false negative rates, provided both radioisotope and blue dye are used to locate the sentinel nodes.
