= Advanced Cyclotron Systems =

Supplier of medical cyclotrons

Advanced Cyclotron Systems, Inc.
- Type: Private Company
- Industry: Particle Accelerators
- Headquarters: Richmond, British Columbia, Canada
- Key people: Richard Eppich CEO
- Products: Cyclotron
- Parent: Ebco Industries
- Website: advancedcyclotron.com

Advanced Cyclotron Systems, Inc. (ACSI) is a company based in Richmond, British Columbia, Canada that supplies and services cyclotrons predominantly used for the production of medical isotopes by hospitals for nuclear medicine. The company was a spin-off of the research program at TRIUMF. The machines are used for the production of isotopes used in Positron emission tomography (PET), Single-photon emission computed tomography (SPECT) or production of technetium-99 for molecular imaging. ACSI controls approximately half the world market for such machines,

Four models of cyclotrons are offered:

- TR-19 (14 MeV to 19 MeV) variable energy negative ion cyclotrons
- TR-24 (15 to 24 MeV) high current cyclotron used for the production of PET and SPECT isotopes; including one machine installed at the Université de Sherbrooke,
- TR-FLEX (18 MeV up to 30 MeV) high current cyclotron used for PET and SPECT isotopes.
- TR-30 (15 MeV to 30 MeV) high current cyclotron used for SPECT isotopes.
