= Ebco Industries =

Canadian manufacturing company

- Company type: Private company
- Industry: Metal Manufacturing
- Founded: 1956; 70 years ago
- Headquarters: Richmond, British Columbia, Canada
- Key people: Richard Eppich (CEO)
- Number of employees: 300
- Subsidiaries: Advanced Cyclotron Systems
- Website: ebco.com

Ebco Industries is a custom-manufacturing company based in Richmond, British Columbia. Ebco was founded by Helmut and Hugo Eppich in 1956 as a small Tool and Die shop, and it has subsequently expanded into a 300,000 sq. ft. manufacturing facility for domestic and international markets providing:

- heavy machining,
- heavy fabrication,
- light precision machining & fabrication
- precision sheet metal,
- repair & refurbishing,
- assembly & testing,
- quality assurance & accreditations,
- shipping capabilities,
- hospital linen carts,
- lightweight lids.

These markets include clean and traditional energy (hydro power generation and oil & gas) mining, pulp & paper, aerospace, military & defense, marine, and nuclear medicine. Ebco has one of the largest fabricating and machining facilities in western North America as well as some of the largest capacity machinery. The company has several divisions that contract manufactures heavy to light machined, fabricated and assembled equipment.

Advanced Cyclotron Systems is a subsidiary of Ebco.
