= Single-photon emission computed tomography =

Nuclear medicine tomographic imaging technique

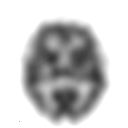
- A SPECT slice of the distribution of technetium exametazime within a patient's brain
- Specialty: Nuclear medicine
- ICD-9-CM: 92.0-92.1
- MeSH: D01589
- OPS-301 code: 3-72

SPECT image (bone tracer) of a mouse MIP

Collimator used to collimate gamma rays (red arrows) in a gamma camera

Single-photon emission computed tomography (SPECT, or less commonly, SPET) is a nuclear medicine tomographic imaging technique using gamma rays. It is very similar to conventional nuclear medicine planar imaging using a gamma camera (that is, scintigraphy), but is able to provide true 3D information. This information is typically presented as cross-sectional slices through the patient, but can be freely reformatted or manipulated as required.

The technique needs delivery of a gamma-emitting radioisotope (a radionuclide) into the patient, normally through injection into the bloodstream. On occasion, the radioisotope is a simple soluble dissolved ion, such as an isotope of gallium(III). Usually, however, a marker radioisotope is attached to a specific ligand to create a radioligand, whose properties bind it to certain types of tissues. This marriage allows the combination of ligand and radiopharmaceutical to be carried and bound to a place of interest in the body, where the ligand concentration is seen by a gamma camera.

== Principles ==
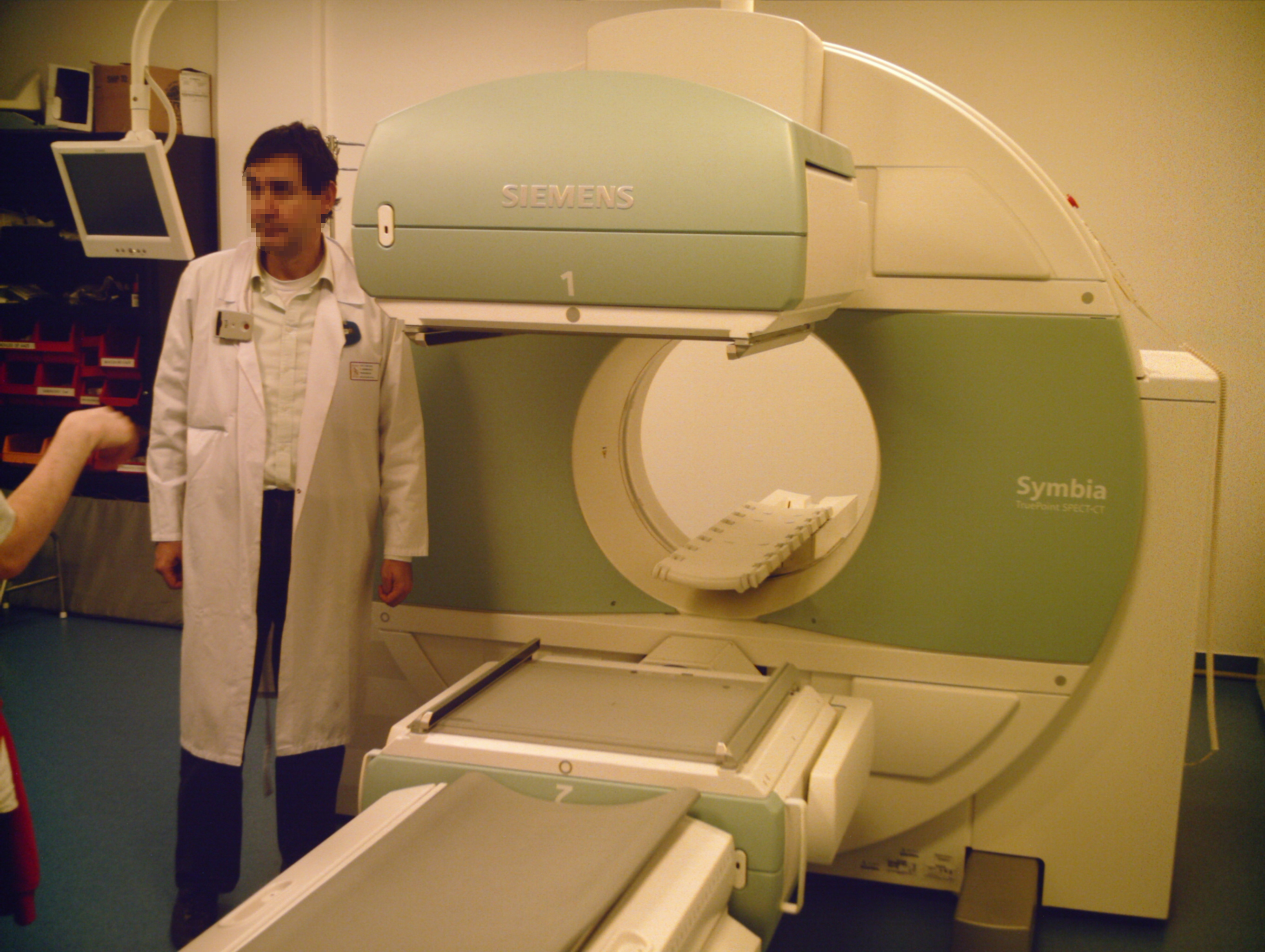
A Siemens brand SPECT scanner, consisting of two gamma cameras

SPECT and other nuclear medicine imaging technologies differ from radiography by imaging the amount of biological activity rather than the structure of the body. This is measured by detecting photon emissions from decaying radionuclides and then reconstructed into a 3D image. These radionucleotides are bonded to carrier molecules that localize the function of interest.

SPECT imaging is performed by using a gamma camera to acquire multiple 2D images (also called projections), from multiple angles. A computer is then used to apply a tomographic reconstruction algorithm to the multiple projections, yielding a 3D data set. This data set may then be manipulated to show thin slices along any chosen axis of the body, similar to those obtained from other tomographic techniques, such as magnetic resonance imaging (MRI), X-ray computed tomography (X-ray CT), and positron emission tomography (PET).

SPECT is similar to PET in its use of radioactive tracer material and detection of gamma rays. In contrast with PET, the tracers used in SPECT emit gamma radiation that is measured directly, whereas PET measures two gamma rays created from the annihilation of positrons that travel in opposing directions. A PET scanner detects these emissions "coincident" in time, which allows for more precise collimation which results in higher spatial resolution and higher quality images than SPECT. PET resolution typically lies within 0.5–6 mm for the more modern PET systems and around 1 cm for SPECT systems. Partly from this, SPECT scanners are cheaper than PET scans because of the more durable and plentiful radioisotopes that are used, such as technetium-99m.

Because SPECT acquisition is very similar to planar gamma camera imaging, the same radiopharmaceuticals may be used. If a patient is examined in another type of nuclear medicine scan, but the images are non-diagnostic, it may be possible to proceed straight to SPECT by moving the patient to a SPECT instrument, or even by simply reconfiguring the camera for SPECT image acquisition while the patient remains on the table.

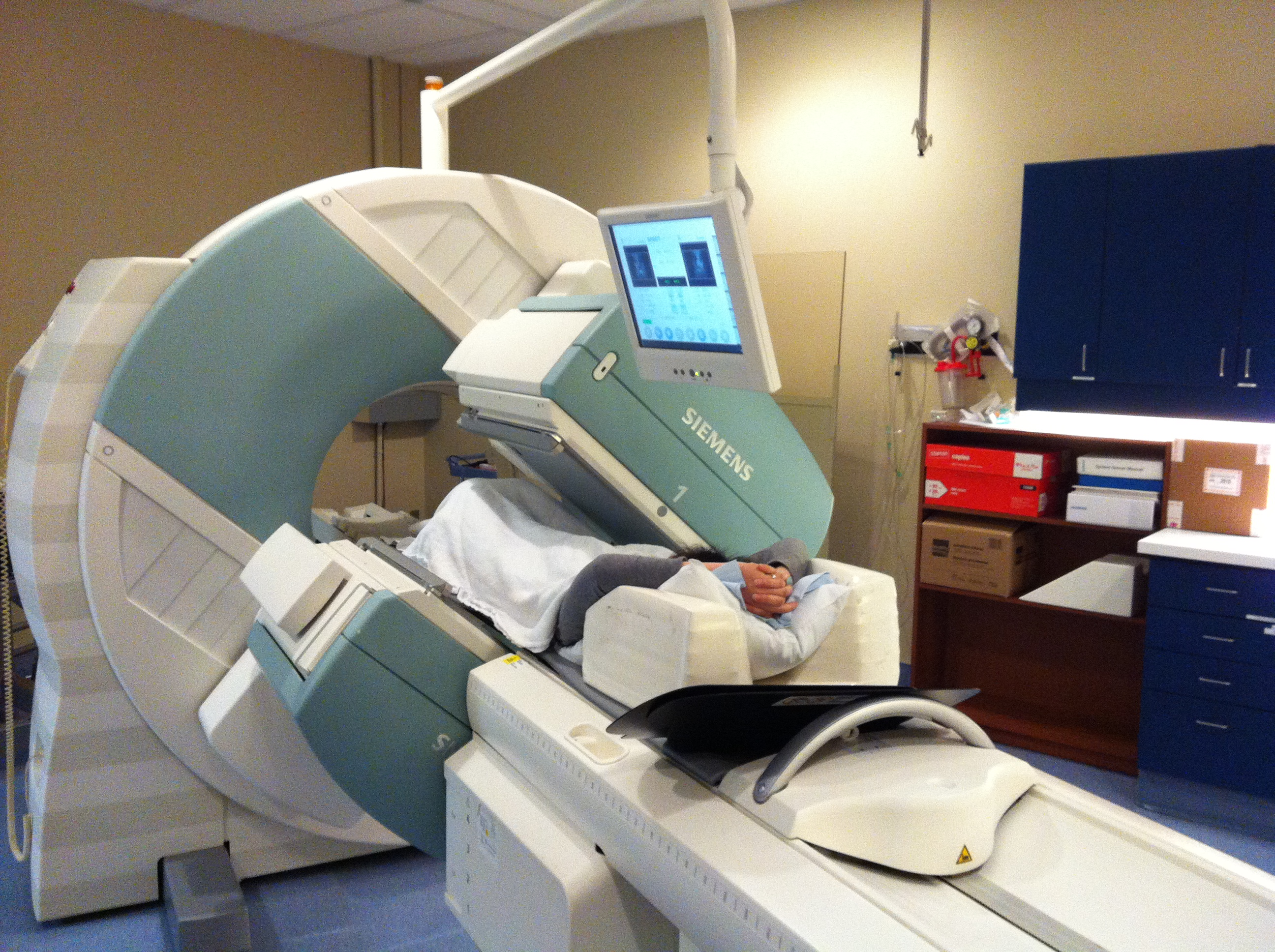
SPECT machine performing a total body bone scan. The patient lies on a table that slides through the machine, while a pair of gamma cameras rotate around her.

To acquire SPECT images, the gamma camera is rotated around the patient. Projections are acquired at defined points during the rotation, typically every 3–6 degrees. 180-degree and 360-degree are standard rotation arcs depending on what is being imaged in the patient. The time taken to obtain each projection is also variable, but 15–20 seconds is typical. This gives a total scan time of 15–20 minutes.

Multi-headed gamma cameras can accelerate acquisition. For example, a dual-headed camera can be used with heads spaced 180 degrees apart, allowing two projections to be acquired simultaneously, with each head requiring 180 degrees of rotation. Triple-head cameras with 120-degree spacing are also used.

Cardiac gated acquisitions are possible with SPECT, just as with planar imaging techniques such as multi gated acquisition scan (MUGA). Triggered by electrocardiogram (EKG) to obtain differential information about the heart in various parts of its cycle, gated myocardial SPECT can be used to obtain quantitative information about myocardial perfusion, thickness, and contractility of the myocardium during various parts of the cardiac cycle, and also to allow calculation of left ventricular ejection fraction, stroke volume, and cardiac output.

== Application ==
SPECT can be used to complement any gamma imaging study, where a true 3D representation can be helpful, such as tumor imaging, infection (leukocyte) imaging, thyroid imaging or bone scintigraphy.

Because SPECT permits accurate localization in 3D space, it can be used to provide information about localized function in internal organs, such as functional cardiac or brain imaging.

=== Myocardial perfusion imaging ===
Myocardial perfusion imaging (MPI) is a form of functional cardiac imaging, used for the diagnosis of ischemic heart disease. The underlying principle is that under conditions of stress, diseased myocardium receives less blood flow than normal myocardium. MPI is one of several types of cardiac stress test.

A cardiac specific radiopharmaceutical is administered, e.g., ^{99m}Tc-tetrofosmin (Myoview, GE healthcare), ^{99m}Tc-sestamibi (Cardiolite, Bristol-Myers Squibb) or Thallium-201 chloride. Following this, the heart rate is raised to induce myocardial stress, either by exercise on a treadmill or pharmacologically with adenosine, dobutamine, or dipyridamole (aminophylline can be used to reverse the effects of dipyridamole).

SPECT imaging performed after stress reveals the distribution of the radiopharmaceutical, and therefore the relative blood flow to the different regions of the myocardium. Diagnosis is made by comparing stress images to a further set of images obtained at rest which are normally acquired prior to the stress images.

MPI has been demonstrated to have an overall accuracy of about 83% (sensitivity: 85%; specificity: 72%) (in a review, not exclusively of SPECT MPI), and is comparable with (or better than) other non-invasive tests for ischemic heart disease.

=== Functional brain imaging ===
Usually, the gamma-emitting tracer used in functional brain imaging is technetium (99mTc) exametazime. ^{99m}Tc, which has a six-hour half-life, is a metastable nuclear isomer that emits gamma rays detectable by a gamma camera. Attaching it to exametazime allows it to be taken up by brain tissue in a manner proportional to brain blood flow, in turn allowing cerebral blood flow to be assessed with the nuclear gamma camera.

Because blood flow in the brain is tightly coupled to local brain metabolism and energy use, the ^{99m}Tc-exametazime tracer (as well as the similar ^{99m}Tc-EC tracer) is used to assess brain metabolism regionally, in an attempt to diagnose and differentiate potential causal pathologies of dementia. Meta-analysis of many reported studies suggests that SPECT with this tracer is about 74% sensitive at diagnosing Alzheimer's disease versus 81% sensitivity for clinical examination (such as cognitive testing). More recent studies have shown the accuracy of SPECT in Alzheimer's diagnosis may be as high as 88%. In meta-analysis, SPECT was superior to clinical examination and clinical criteria (91% vs. 70%) in its ability to differentiate Alzheimer's disease from vascular dementias. This latter ability relates to SPECT's imaging of local metabolism of the brain, in which the patchy loss of cortical metabolism seen in multiple strokes differs clearly from the more even or "smooth" loss of non-occipital cortical brain function typical of Alzheimer's disease. Another review article, published in 2012, showed that multi-headed SPECT cameras with quantitative analysis result in an overall sensitivity of 84-89% and an overall specificity of 83-89% in cross-sectional studies and sensitivity of 82-96% and specificity of 83-89% for longitudinal studies of dementia.

^{99m}Tc-exametazime SPECT scanning competes with fludeoxyglucose (FDG) PET scanning of the brain, which works to assess regional brain glucose metabolism, to provide very similar information about local brain damage from many processes. SPECT is more widely available, because the radioisotope used is longer-lasting and far less expensive in SPECT, and the gamma-scanning equipment is less expensive as well. While ^{99m}Tc is extracted from relatively simple technetium-99m generators, which are delivered to hospitals and scanning centers weekly to supply fresh radioisotope, FDG PET relies on FDG, which is made in an expensive medical cyclotron and "hot lab" (automated chemistry lab for radiopharmaceutical manufacture), and then delivered immediately to scanning sites because of the natural short 110-minute half-life of fluorine-18.

=== Applications in nuclear technology ===
In the nuclear power sector, the SPECT technique can be applied to image radioisotope distributions in irradiated nuclear fuels. Due to the irradiation of nuclear fuel (e.g. uranium) with neutrons in a nuclear reactor, a wide array of gamma-emitting radionuclides are naturally produced in the fuel, such as fission products (cesium-137, barium-140 and europium-154) and activation products (chromium-51 and cobalt-58). These may be imaged using SPECT in order to verify the presence of fuel rods in a stored fuel assembly for IAEA safeguards purposes, to validate predictions of core simulation codes, or to study the behavior of the nuclear fuel in normal operation, or in accident scenarios.

== Reconstruction ==
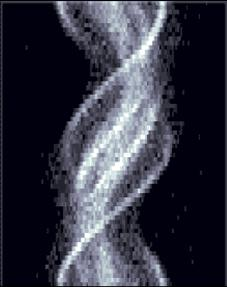
SPECT Sinogram

In SPECT, the quality of reconstructed images is generally limited by low spatial resolution and sensitivity, which causes increased attenuation and the risk of artifacts due to its limitations.

Scanning is time consuming, and it is essential that there is no patient movement during the scan time. This is due to the detector rotation around the patient that collects multiple projections. Movement can cause major imperfections to the reconstructed images, although movement compensation reconstruction techniques can help with this. Furthermore, iterative algorithms can be made more efficacious using the superiorization methodology.

Older versions of SPECT technology used of MLEM algorithms or maximum likelihood expectation maximization algorithms. Moving forward to more modern day systems, the algorithms have improved to algorithms such as OSEM or the Ordered Subset Expectation Maximization algorithm. These algorithms are like MLEM but break the data down into subsets, which creates faster and higher quality image reconstruction.

These algorithms allow for SPECT systems to limit the amount of artifacts and attenuation that appear in images. By doing so, the activity of the radiation in tissues can be more accurately interpreted. Along with OSEM, scatter correction and resolution recovery algorithms are also applied to further clear up SPECT images.

== Typical SPECT acquisition protocols ==
Study	Radioisotope	Emission energy (keV)	Half-life	Radiopharmaceutical	Activity (MBq)	Rotation (degrees)	Projections	Image resolution	Time per projection (s)
Bone scan	technetium-99m	140	6 hours	Phosphonates / Bisphosphonates	800	360	120	128 x 128	30
Myocardial perfusion scan	technetium-99m	140	6 hours	tetrofosmin; Sestamibi	700	180	60	64 x 64	25
Sestamibi parathyroid scan	technetium-99m	140	6 hours	Sestamibi					
Brain scan	technetium-99m	140	6 hours	Tc exametazime; ECD	555-1110	360	64	128 x 128	30
Neuroendocrine or neurological tumor scan	iodine-123 or iodine-131	159	13 hours or 8 days	MIBG	400	360	60	64 x 64	30
White cell scan	indium-111 & technetium-99m	171 & 245	67 hours	in vitro labelled leucocytes	18	360	60	64 x 64	30

== SPECT/CT ==
In some cases, a SPECT gamma scanner may be modified to operate with a conventional CT scanner to combine Single-photon emission computed tomography with Computed tomography to provide both the detailed physiology of the body, as well as the ability to show the structure of the body being scanned. By layering the SPECT and CT data, a more accurate image can be created. In addition to this, the addition of CT helps to correct attenuation in the SPECT imaging. This can be useful for identifying tumors or tissues that may be seen on SPECT scintigraphy but are difficult to locate precisely with regard to other anatomical structures.

In more recent versions of SPECT/CT systems, the detectors have improved significantly through the use of cadmium-zinc-telluride (CZT) detectors and the advancements in reconstruction algorithms. These advancements have increased image quality compared to older versions.

With the advancements of SPECT/CT, the technology is playing an increasing role in clinical imaging applications and theranostics. For example, SPECT/CT may be used in sestamibi parathyroid scan applications, where the technique is useful in locating ectopic parathyroid adenomas, which may not be in their usual locations in the thyroid gland.

== Quality control ==
The overall performance of SPECT systems can be performed by quality control tools such as the Jaszczak phantom.

== See also ==
- Daniel Amen, psychiatrist who uses SPECT for diagnoses
- Functional neuroimaging
- Gamma camera
- Magnetic resonance imaging
- Neuroimaging
- Positron emission tomography
- ISAS (Ictal-Interictal SPECT Analysis by SPM)
