= Deoxyglucose =

Chemistry name

Deoxyglucose may refer to:

- 1,5-Anhydroglucitol (1-deoxyglucose)
- 2-Deoxy-D-glucose (2-deoxyglucose)
