= Technetium (99mTc) exametazime =

Chemical compound

Technetium (^{99m}Tc) exametazime

Clinical data
- Trade names: Medi-Exametazim
- License data: US FDA: Ceretec
- Routes of administration: Intravenous
- ATC code: V09AA01 (WHO) V09HA02 (WHO) (labelled leucocytes)

Legal status
- Legal status: US: ℞-only

Identifiers
- IUPAC name: [[(3RS,3'RS)-3,3'-[(2,2-Dimethyltrimethylene)diimino][di-2-butanone]dioximato](^{3–})-N,N',N'',N''']oxotechnetium (^{99m}Tc)
- CAS Number: 99944-78-2
- PubChem CID: 9552069
- UNII: 3B744AG22N

Chemical and physical data
- Formula: C_{13}H_{25}N_{4}O_{3}Tc
- Molar mass: 383 g·mol^{−1}
- 3D model (JSmol): Interactive image; Interactive image
- Chirality: racemic
- SMILES: CC1(C)CN2[Tc-]3(N4C1)([N+](O[H-]O[N+]3=C(C)[C@H]4C)=C(C)[C@H]2C)=O; CC1(C)CN2[Tc-]3(N4C1)([N+](O[H-]O[N+]3=C(C)[C@@H]4C)=C(C)[C@@H]2C)=O

Technetium (^{99m}Tc) exametazime is a radiopharmaceutical sold under the trade name Ceretec, and is used by nuclear medicine physicians for the detection of altered regional cerebral perfusion in stroke and other cerebrovascular diseases. It can also be used for the labelling of leukocytes to localise intra-abdominal infections and inflammatory bowel disease. Exametazime (the part without technetium) is sometimes referred to as hexamethylpropylene amine oxime or HMPAO, although correct chemical names are:

- (NE)-N-[(3R)-3-[[3-[[(2R,3E)-3-hydroxyiminobutan-2-yl]amino]-2,2-dimethylpropyl]amino]butan-2-ylidene]hydroxylamine
- or 3,3'-((2,2,-dimethyl-1,3-propanediyl)diimino)bis-2-butanone dioxime.

== Chemistry ==
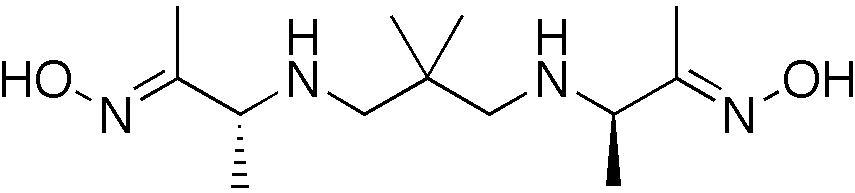
One of the two enantiomers of exametazime

The drug consists of exametazime as a chelating agent for the radioisotope technetium-99m. Both enantiomeric forms of exametazime are used—the drug is racemic. The third stereoisomer of this structure, the meso form, is not included.
