= Gated SPECT =

Gated SPECT is a nuclear medicine imaging technique, typically for the heart in myocardial perfusion imagery. An electrocardiogram (ECG) guides the image acquisition, and the resulting set of single-photon emission computed tomography (SPECT) images shows the heart as it contracts over the interval from one R wave to the next. Gated myocardial perfusion imaging has been shown to have high prognostic value and sensitivity for critical stenosis.

The acquisition computer defines the number of time bins or frames to divide the R to R interval of the patient's electrocardiogram. A "window" may be set which discards data from R to R intervals which deviate from some amount from the patient's average R to R wave duration. This discards preventricular contractions and arrhythmias from the acquisition and improves the quality of the resulting study.

The gamma camera will take a series of pictures around the patient, dividing each 'step' of the camera head's motion into the predetermined number of 'frames.' The details of this acquisition vary with single-headed, double-headed, or triple-headed cameras — but a single-headed camera typically acquires 32 'steps' over an arc of 180 degrees around the patient.

When the acquisition is completed, the technologist must process the images to create a data set which represents the volume of tracer as seen by the camera during the study acquisition. In gated SPECT, this process is performed for each of the time bins defined by the acquisition protocol. When viewed by the physician for interpretation, the heart can be watched as it contracts and expands from diastole to systole.

The computer can calculate the patient's ejection fraction, end diastolic volume, wall motion, end systolic volume, myocardial thickening, shortening, and contractility. However, one is viewing an average of all collected heart beats over the image acquisition. Noise on the ECG, patient motion, artefacts, or a change in the heart rate during acquisition can degrade the quality of the resulting gated image dataset.
