= Radiopharmaceutical =

Pharmaceutical drug which emits radiation, used as a diagnostic or therapeutic agent

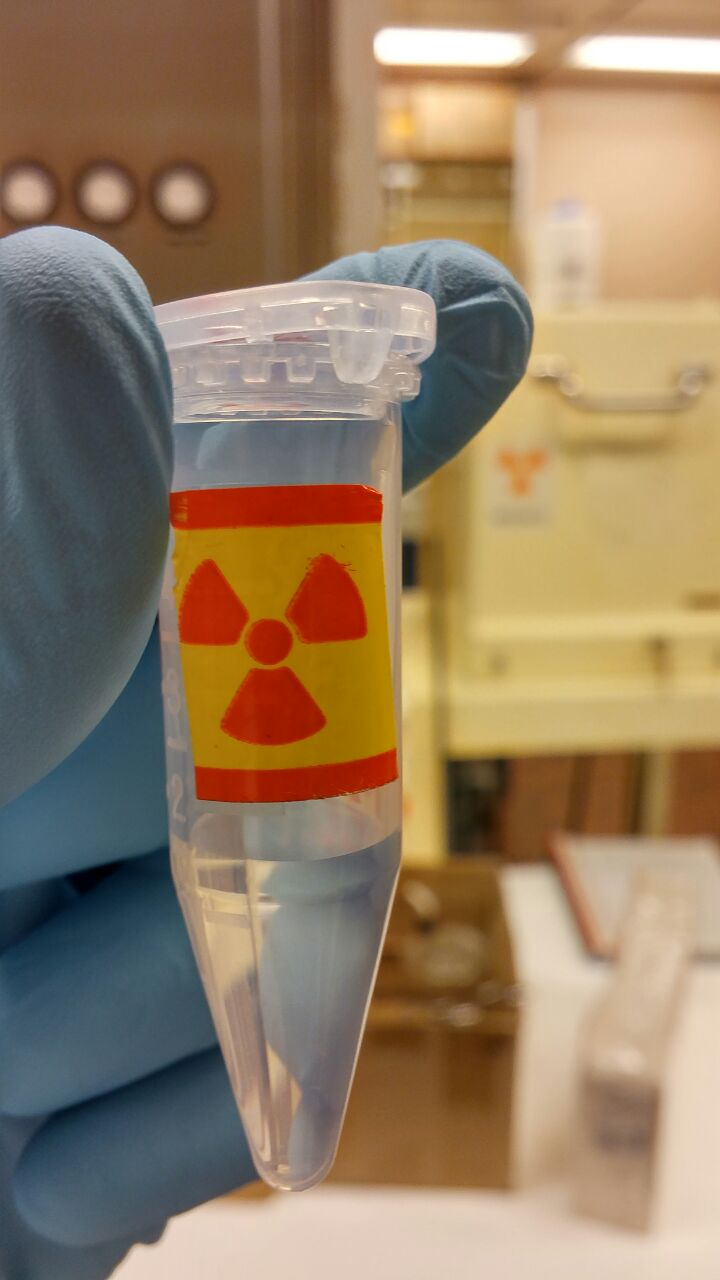
A carbon-11 labelled radiopharmaceutical

Radiopharmaceuticals, or medicinal radiocompounds, are a group of pharmaceutical drugs containing radioactive isotopes. Radiopharmaceuticals can be used as diagnostic and therapeutic agents. Radiopharmaceuticals emit radiation themselves, which is different from contrast media which absorb or alter external electromagnetism or ultrasound. Radiopharmacology is the branch of pharmacology that specializes in these agents.

The main group of these compounds are the radiotracers used to diagnose dysfunction in body tissues. While not all medical isotopes are radioactive, radiopharmaceuticals are the oldest and remain the most common of such drugs.

== Mechanism of action ==
Radiopharmaceuticals contain a radioactive isotope and are designed to accumulate in particular tissues or reflect a biological process. Some use a small molecule, peptide, or antibody to carry the isotope to a target; others are administered in ionic form. Where an agent travels in the body and the radiation emitted by its isotope determine its diagnostic or therapeutic use.

== Diagnostic and therapeutic uses ==
Diagnostic radiopharmaceuticals produce radiation that can be detected outside the body to show where an agent has accumulated. Gamma-emitting agents, including those based on technetium-99m, are used in single-photon emission computed tomography (SPECT). Positron-emitting agents, including those based on fluorine-18, are used in positron emission tomography (PET). Such imaging can assess organ function as well as detect disease.

Therapeutic radiopharmaceuticals deliver radiation to diseased tissue. They include agents using beta-emitting isotopes, such as iodine-131 and lutetium-177, and alpha-emitting isotopes, such as radium-223. Other isotopes studied for targeted alpha therapy include actinium-225 and lead-212. Related imaging and treatment agents can be designed to target the same biological feature, an approach known as theranostics.

== Drug nomenclature ==
As with other pharmaceutical drugs, there is standardization of the drug nomenclature for radiopharmaceuticals, although various standards coexist. The International Nonproprietary Names (INNs), United States Pharmacopeia (USP) names, and IUPAC names for these agents are usually similar other than trivial style differences.

== Specific radiopharmaceuticals ==
A list of nuclear medicine radiopharmaceuticals follows. Some radioisotopes are used in ionic or inert form without attachment to a pharmaceutical; these are also included. There is a section for each radioisotope with a table of radiopharmaceuticals using that radioisotope. The sections are ordered by atomic number of the radioisotope. Sections for the same element are then ordered by atomic mass number.

=== Hydrogen-3 ===
^{3}H or tritium is a beta emitter.

Name	Investigation	Route of administration	In-vitro / in-vivo	Imaging / non-imaging
H3-water	Total body water	Oral or IV	In-vitro	Non-imaging

=== Carbon-11 ===
^{11}C is a positron emitter.

Name	Investigation	Route of administration	In-vitro / in-vivo	Imaging / non-imaging
C11-L-methyl-methionine	Brain tumour imaging Parathyroid imaging	IV	In-vivo	Imaging

=== Carbon-14 ===
^{14}C is a beta emitter.

Name	Investigation	Route of administration	In-vitro / in-vivo	Imaging / non-imaging
C14-Glycocholic acid	Breath test for small intestine bacterial overgrowth	Oral	In-vitro	Non-imaging
C14-PABA (para-amino benzoic acid)	Pancreatic studies	Oral	In-vitro	Non-imaging
C14-Urea	Breath test to detect Helicobacter pylori	Oral	In-vitro	Non-imaging
C14-d-xylose	Breath test for small intestine bacterial overgrowth	Oral	In-vitro	Non-imaging

=== Nitrogen-13 ===
^{13}N is a positron emitter.

Name	Investigation	Route of administration	In-vitro / in-vivo	Imaging / non-imaging
N13-Ammonia	Myocardial blood flow imaging	IV	In-vivo	Imaging

=== Oxygen-15 ===
^{15}O is a positron emitter.

Name	Investigation	Route of administration	In-vitro / in-vivo	Imaging / non-imaging
O15-Water	Cerebral blood flow imaging Myocardial blood flow imaging	IV bolus	In-vivo	Imaging

=== Fluorine-18 ===
^{18}F is a positron emitter with a half-life of 109 minutes. It is produced in medical cyclotrons, usually from oxygen-18, and then chemically attached to a pharmaceutical formulation.

Name	Investigation	Route of administration	In-vitro / in-vivo	Imaging / non-imaging
F18-FDG (Fluorodeoxyglucose)	Tumor imaging Myocardial imaging	IV	In-vivo	Imaging
F18-Sodium Fluoride	Bone imaging	IV	In-vivo	Imaging
F18-Fluorocholine	Prostate tumor imaging	IV	In-vivo	Imaging
F18-Desmethoxyfallypride	Dopamine receptor imaging	IV	In-vivo	Imaging

=== Sodium-22 ===
^{22}Na is a positron and gamma emitter.

Name	Investigation	Route of administration	In-vitro / in-vivo	Imaging / non-imaging
Na22-Na^{+}	Electrolyte studies	Oral or IV	In-vitro	Non-imaging

=== Sodium-24 ===
^{24}Na is a beta and gamma emitter.

Name	Investigation	Route of administration	In-vitro / in-vivo	Imaging / non-imaging
Na24-Na^{+}	Electrolyte studies	Oral or IV	In-vitro	Non-imaging

=== Phosphorus-32 ===
^{32}P is a beta emitter.

Name	Treatment of	Route of administration
P32-Phosphate	Polycythemia and related disorders	IV or Oral

=== Calcium-47 ===
^{47}Ca is a beta and gamma emitter.

Name	Investigation	Route of administration	In-vitro / in-vivo	Imaging / non-imaging
Ca-47-Ca^{2+}	Bone metabolism	IV	In-vitro	Non-imaging

=== Chromium-51 ===
^{51}Cr is a gamma emitter.

Name	Investigation	Route of administration	In-vitro / in-vivo	Imaging / non-imaging
Cr51-[heart scan/blood volume	Red cell volume heart scan; sites of sequestration; gastrointestinal blood loss	IV	In-vitro	Non-imaging
Cr51-Cr^{3+}	Gastrointestinal protein loss	IV	In-vitro	Non-imaging
Cr51-EDTA (ethylenediaminetetraacetic acid)	Glomerular filtration rate measurement	IV	In-vitro	Non-imaging

=== Iron-59 ===
^{59}Fe is a beta and gamma emitter.

Name	Investigation	Route of administration	In-vitro / in-vivo	Imaging / non-imaging
Fe59-Fe^{2+} or Fe^{3+}	Iron metabolism	IV	In-vitro	Non-imaging

=== Cobalt-57 ===
^{57}Co is a gamma emitter.

Name	Investigation	Route of administration	In-vitro / in-vivo	Imaging / non-imaging
Co57-Cyanocobalamin (vitamin B_{12})	Gastrointestinal absorption	Oral	In-vitro	Non-imaging

=== Cobalt-58 ===
^{58}Co is a gamma emitter.

Name	Investigation	Route of administration	In-vitro / in-vivo	Imaging / non-imaging
Co58-Cyanocobalamin (vitamin B_{12})	Gastrointestinal absorption	Oral	In-vitro	Non-imaging

=== Gallium-67 ===
^{67}Ga is a gamma emitter.

Name	Investigation	Route of administration	In-vitro / in-vivo	Imaging / non-imaging
Ga67-Ga^{3+}	Tumor imaging	IV	In-vivo	Imaging
Ga67-Ga^{3+}	Infection/inflammation imaging	IV	In-vivo	Imaging

=== Gallium-68 ===
^{68}Ga is a positron emitter, with a 68-minute half-life, produced by elution from germanium-68 in a gallium-68 generator or by proton irradiation of zinc-68.

Name	Investigation	Route of administration	In-vitro / in-vivo	Imaging / non-imaging
Ga68-Dotatoc or Dotatate	Neuroendocrine tumor imaging	IV	In-vivo	Imaging
Ga68-PSMA	Prostate cancer imaging	IV	In-vivo	Imaging

=== Selenium-75 ===
^{75}Se is a gamma emitter.

Name	Investigation	Route of administration	In-vitro / in-vivo	Imaging / non-imaging
Se75-Selenorcholesterol	Adrenal gland imaging	IV	In-vivo	Imaging
Se75-SeHCAT (23-Seleno-25-homo-tauro-cholate)	Bile salt absorption	Oral	In-vivo	Imaging

=== Krypton-81m ===
^{81}Kr^{m} is a gamma emitter.

Name	Investigation	Route of administration	In-vitro / in-vivo	Imaging / non-imaging the radioactive substance
Kr81m-Gas	Lung ventilation imaging	Inhalation	In-vivo	Imaging
Kr-81m-Aqueous solution	Lung perfusion imaging	IV	In-vivo	Imaging

=== Rubidium-82 ===
^{82}Rb is a positron and gamma emitter.

Name	Investigation of	Route of administration
Rb-82 chloride	Myocardial Imaging	IV

=== Strontium-89 ===
^{89}Sr is a beta emitter.

Name	Treatment of	Route of administration
Sr89-Chloride	Bone metastases	IV

=== Yttrium-90 ===
^{90}Y is a beta emitter.

Name	Treatment of	Route of administration
Y90-Silicate	Arthritic conditions	Intra-articular
Y90-Silicate	Malignant disease	Intracavitary

=== Technetium-99m ===
Technetium-99m is a gamma emitter. It is obtained on-site at the imaging center as the soluble pertechnetate which is eluted from a technetium-99m generator, and then either used directly as this soluble salt, or else used to synthesize a number of technetium-99m-based radiopharmaceuticals.

Name	Investigation	Route of administration	In-vitro / in-vivo	Imaging / non-imaging
Tc99m-pertechnetate	Thyroid uptake and thyroid imaging Stomach and salivary gland imaging Meckel's diverticulum imaging Brain imaging Micturating cystogram First pass blood flow imaging First pass peripheral vascular imaging	IV	In-vivo	Imaging
Tc99m-pertechnetate	Lacrimal imaging	Eye drops	In-vivo	Imaging
Tc99m-Human albumin	Cardiac blood pool imaging	IV	In-vivo	Imaging
Tc99m-Human albumin	Peripheral vascular imaging	IV	In-vivo	Imaging
Tc99m-Human albumin macroaggregates or microspheres	Lung perfusion imaging	IV	In-vivo	Imaging
Tc99m-Human albumin macroaggregates or microspheres	Lung perfusion imaging with venography	IV	In-vivo	Imaging
Tc99m-Phosphonates and phosphates (MDP/HDP)	Bone imaging	IV	In-vivo	Imaging
Tc99m-Phosphonates and phosphates	Myocardial imaging	IV	In-vivo	Imaging
Tc99m-DTPA (diethylenetriaminepenta-acetic acid)	Renal imaging First pass blood flow studies Brain imaging	IV	In-vivo	Imaging
Tc99m-DTPA (diethylenetriaminepenta-acetic acid)	Lung ventilation imaging	Aerosol inhalation	In-vivo	Imaging
Tc99m-DMSA(V) (dimercaptosuccinic acid)	Tumor imaging	IV	In-vivo	Imaging
Tc99m-DMSA(III) (dimercaptosuccinic acid)	Renal imaging	IV	In-vivo	Imaging
Tc99m-Colloid	Bone marrow imaging GI Bleeding	IV	In-vivo	Imaging
Tc99m-Colloid	Lymph node imaging	Interstitial	In-vivo	Imaging
Tc99m-Colloid	Esophageal transit and reflux imaging Gastric emptying imaging	Oral	In-vivo	Imaging
Tc99m-Colloid	Lacrimal imaging	Eye drops	In-vivo	Imaging
Tc99m-HIDA (Hepatic iminodiacetic acid)	Functional biliary system imaging	IV	In-vivo	Imaging
Tc99m-Denatured (heat damaged) red blood cells	Red cell volume Spleen imaging	IV	In-vitro	Non-imaging
Tc99m-Whole red blood cells	GI bleeding Cardiac blood pool imaging Peripheral vascular imaging	IV	In-vivo	Imaging
Tc99m-MAG3 (mercaptoacetyltriglycine)	Renal imaging First pass blood flow imaging	IV	In-vivo	Imaging
Tc99m-Exametazime (HMPAO)	Cerebral blood flow imaging	IV	In-vivo	Imaging
Tc99m-Exametazime labelled leucocytes	Infection/inflammation imaging	IV	In-vivo	Imaging
Tc99m-Sestamibi (MIBI - methoxy isobutyl isonitrile)	Parathyroid imaging Non-specific tumor imaging Thyroid tumor imaging Breast imaging Myocardial imaging	IV	In-vivo	Imaging
Tc99m-Sulesomab (IMMU-MN3 murine Fab'-SH antigranulocyte monoclonal antibody fragments)	Infection/inflammation imaging	IV	In-vivo	Imaging
Tc99m-Technegas	Lung ventilation imaging	Inhalation	In-vivo	Imaging
Tc99m-Human immunoglobulin	Infection/inflammation imaging	IV	In-vivo	Imaging
Tc99m-Tetrofosmin	Parathyroid imaging Myocardial imaging	IV	In-vivo	Imaging
Tc99m-ECD (ethyl cysteinate dimer)	Brain imaging-----	IV	In-vivo	Imaging

=== Indium-111 ===
^{111}In is a gamma emitter.

Name	Investigation	Route of administration	In-vitro / in-vivo	Imaging / non-imaging
In111-DTPA (diethylenetriaminepenta-acetic acid)	Ventriculo-peritoneal shunt (LaVeen Shunt)	intraperitoneal injection	In-vivo	Imaging the radioactive substance
In111-DTPA (diethylenetriaminepenta-acetic acid)	Cisternography	Intra-cisternal	In-vivo	Imaging
In111-Leukocytes	Infection/inflammation imaging	IV	In-vivo	Imaging
In111-Platelets	Thrombus imaging	IV	In-vivo	Imaging
In111-Pentetreotide	Somatostatin receptor imaging	IV	In-vivo	Imaging
In111-Octreotide	Somatostatin receptor imaging (Octreoscan)	IV	In-vivo	Imaging

=== Iodine-123 ===
Iodine-123 (I-123) is a gamma emitter. It is used only diagnostically, as its radiation is penetrating and short-lived.

Name	Investigation	Route of administration	In-vitro / in-vivo	Imaging / non-imaging
I123-Iodide	Thyroid uptake	Oral or IV	In-vivo	Non-imaging
I123-Iodide	Thyroid imaging Thyroid metastases imaging	Oral or IV	In-vivo	Imaging
I123-o-Iodohippurate	Renal imaging	IV	In-vivo	Imaging
I123-MIBG (m-iodobenzylguanidine)	Neuroectodermal tumour imaging	IV	In-vivo	Imaging
I123-FP-CIT	SPECT imaging of Parkinson's Disease	IV	In-vivo	Imaging

=== Iodine-125 ===
^{125}I is a gamma emitter with a long half-life of 59.4 days (the longest of all radioiodines used in medicine). Iodine-123 is preferred for imaging, so I-125 is used diagnostically only when the test requires a longer period to prepare the radiopharmaceutical and trace it, such as a fibrinogen scan to diagnose clotting. I-125's gamma radiation is of medium penetration, making it more useful as a therapeutic isotope for brachytherapy implant of radioisotope capsules for local treatment of cancers.

Name	Investigation	Route of administration	In-vitro / in-vivo	Imaging / non-imaging
I125-fibrinogen	Clot imaging	IV	In-vivo	Imaging

=== Iodine-131 ===
^{131}I is a beta and gamma emitter. It is used both to destroy thyroid and thyroid cancer tissues (via beta radiation, which is short-range), and also other neuroendocrine tissues when used in MIBG. It can also be seen by a gamma camera, and can serve as a diagnostic imaging tracer, when treatment is also being attempted at the same time. However iodine-123 is usually preferred when only imaging is desired.

==== Diagnostic ====
Name	Investigation	Route of administration	In-vitro / in-vivo	Imaging / non-imaging
I131-Iodide	Thyroid uptake	Oral	In-vivo	Non-imaging
I131-Iodide	Thyroid metastases imaging	Oral or IV	In-vivo	Imaging
I131-MIBG (m-iodobenzylguanidine)	Neuroectodermal tumor imaging	IV	In-vivo	Imaging

==== Therapeutic ====
Name	Treatment of	Route of administration
I131-Iodide	Thyrotoxicosis	IV or Oral
I131-Iodide	Non-toxic goiter	IV or Oral
I131-Iodide	Thyroid carcinoma	IV or Oral
I131-MIBG (m-iodobenzylguanidine)	Malignant disease	IV

=== Xenon-133 ===
^{133}Xe is a gamma emitter.

Name	Investigation	Route of administration	In-vitro / in-vivo	Imaging / non-imaging
Xe133-gas	Lung ventilation studies	Inhalation	In-vivo	Imaging
Xe133 in isotonic sodium chloride solution	Cerebral blood flow	IV	In-vivo	Imaging

=== Samarium-153 ===
^{153}Sm is a beta and gamma emitter.

Name	Treatment of	Route of administration
Sm153-EDTMP (Ethylenediaminotetramethylenephosphoric acid)	Bone metastases	IV

=== Erbium-169 ===
^{169}Er is a beta emitter.

Name	Treatment of	Route of administration
Er169-Colloid	Arthritic conditions	Intra-articular

=== Lutetium-177 ===
^{177}Lu is a beta emitter.

Name	Treatment of	Route of administration	In-vitro / in-vivo
^{177}Lu-DOTA-TATE	gastroenteropancreatic neuroendocrine tumors (GEP-NETs)	IV	In-vivo

=== Thallium-201 ===
^{201}Tl is a gamma emitter.

Name	Investigation	Route of administration	In-vitro / in-vivo	Imaging / non-imaging
Tl201-Tl^{+}	Non-specific tumor imaging Thyroid tumor imaging Myocardial imaging Parathyroid imaging	IV	In-vivo	Imaging

=== Radium-223 ===
^{223}Ra is an alpha emitter.

Name	Treatment of	Route of administration
Ra223 cation (^{223}RaCl_{2})	metastatic cancer in bone	IV

== See also ==
- Radiopharmacology
- PET radiotracer
- Radioligand
- Isotopes in medicine
- Radiocontrast agent
