= Technetium-99m =

Metastable nuclear isomer of technetium-99

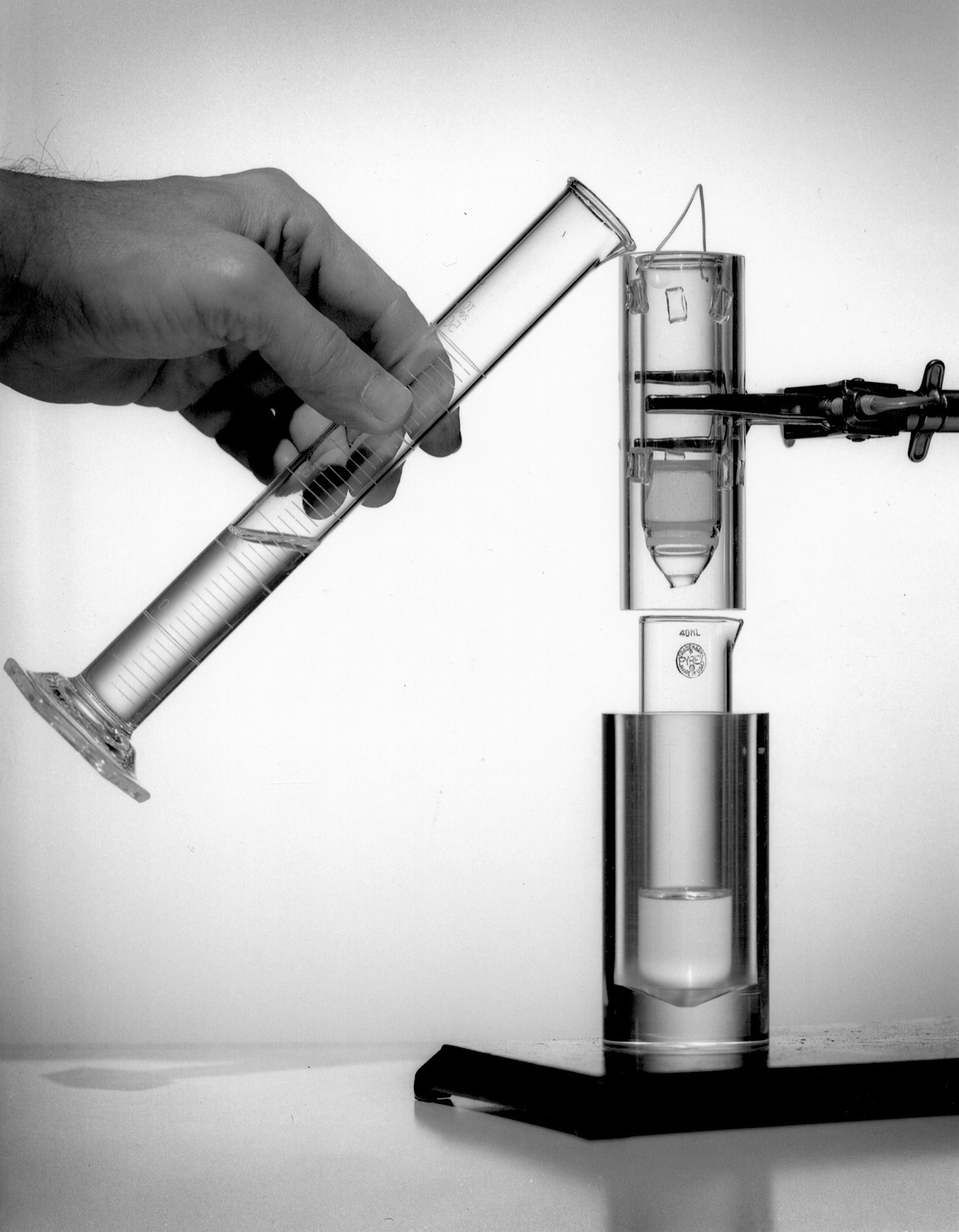
- The first technetium-99m generator, 1958. A ^{99m}Tc pertechnetate solution is being eluted from ^{99}Mo molybdate bound to a chromatographic substrate

General
- Symbol: ^{99m}Tc
- Names: technetium-99m
- Protons (Z): 43
- Neutrons (N): 56

Nuclide data
- Half-life (t_{1/2}): 6.0066 h
- Isotope mass: 98.9063 Da
- Spin: 1/2−
- Excess energy: −87327.195 keV
- Nuclear binding energy: 8613.603 keV
- Parent isotopes: ^{99}Mo (65.932 h)
- Decay products: ^{99}Tc

Decay modes
- Decay mode: Decay energy (MeV)
- Isomeric transition: 0.1405 (99%)
- 0.1427 (~1%)

Technetium-99m (^{99m}Tc) is a metastable nuclear isomer of technetium-99 (itself an isotope of technetium), symbolized as ^{99m}Tc, that is used in tens of millions of medical diagnostic procedures annually, making it the most commonly used medical radioisotope in the world.

Technetium-99m is used as a radioactive tracer and can be detected in the body by medical equipment (gamma cameras). It is well suited to the role, because it emits readily detectable gamma rays with a photon energy of 140.5 keV (within the range emitted by conventional X-ray diagnostic equipment) and its half-life is 6.0066 hours (meaning 93.7% of it decays to ^{99}Tc in 24 hours). The relatively short physical half-life of the isotope and its biological half-life of 1 day (in terms of human activity and metabolism) allows for scanning procedures which collect data rapidly but keep total patient radiation exposure low. The same characteristics make the isotope unsuitable for therapeutic use because Technetium-99m emits penetrating gamma rays and decays quickly, so it cannot deliver a strong, localized dose to destroy diseased tissue.

Technetium-99m was discovered as a product of cyclotron bombardment of molybdenum. This procedure produced molybdenum-99, a radionuclide with a longer half-life (2.75 days), which decays to ^{99m}Tc. This longer decay time allows for ^{99}Mo to be shipped to medical facilities, where ^{99m}Tc is extracted from the sample as it is produced. In turn, the ^{99}Mo is usually created by fission of highly enriched uranium in a small number of research and material testing nuclear reactors in several countries.

== History ==
=== Discovery ===
In 1938, Emilio Segrè and Glenn T. Seaborg isolated for the first time the metastable isotope technetium-99m, after bombarding natural molybdenum with 8 MeV deuterons in the 37-inch (940 mm) cyclotron of Ernest Orlando Lawrence's Radiation laboratory. In 1970 Seaborg explained that:

we discovered an isotope of great scientific interest, because it decayed by means of an isomeric transition with emission of a line spectrum of electrons coming from an almost completely internally converted gamma ray transition. [actually, only 12% of the decays are by internal conversion] (...) This was a form of radioactive decay which had never been observed before this time. Segrè and I were able to show that this radioactive isotope of the element with the atomic number 43 decayed with a half-life of 6.6 h [later updated to 6.0 h] and that it was the daughter of a 67-h [later updated to 66 h] molybdenum parent radioactivity. This chain of decay was later shown to have the mass number 99, and (...) the 6.6-h activity acquired the designation 'technetium-99m.

Later in 1940, Emilio Segrè and Chien-Shiung Wu published experimental results of an analysis of fission products of uranium-235, including molybdenum-99, and detected the presence of an isomer of element 43 with a 6-hour half-life, later labelled as technetium-99m.

=== Early medical applications in the United States ===
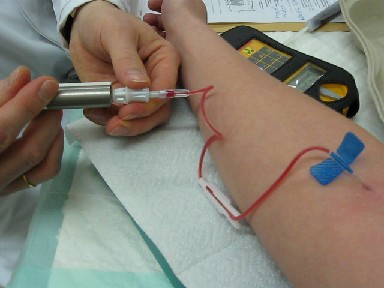
A technetium injection contained in a shielded syringe

^{99m}Tc remained a scientific curiosity until the 1950s when Powell Richards realized the potential of technetium-99m as a medical radiotracer and promoted its use among the medical community. While Richards was in charge of the radioisotope production at the Hot Lab Division of the Brookhaven National Laboratory, Walter Tucker and Margaret Greene were working on how to improve the separation process purity of the short-lived eluted daughter product iodine-132 from its parent, tellurium-132 (with a half-life of 3.2 days), produced in the Brookhaven Graphite Research Reactor. They detected a trace contaminant which proved to be ^{99m}Tc, which was coming from ^{99}Mo and was following tellurium in the chemistry of the separation process for other fission products. Based on the similarities between the chemistry of the tellurium-iodine parent-daughter pair, Tucker and Greene developed the first technetium-99m generator in 1958. It was not until 1960 that Richards became the first to suggest the idea of using technetium as a medical tracer.

The first US publication to report on medical scanning of ^{99m}Tc appeared in August 1963. Sorensen and Archambault demonstrated that intravenously injected carrier-free ^{99}Mo selectively and efficiently concentrated in the liver, becoming an internal generator of ^{99m}Tc. After build-up of ^{99m}Tc, they could visualize the liver using the 140 keV gamma ray emission.

=== Worldwide expansion ===
The production and medical use of ^{99m}Tc rapidly expanded across the world in the 1960s, benefiting from the development and continuous improvements of the gamma cameras.

==== Americas ====
Between 1963 and 1966, numerous scientific studies demonstrated the use of ^{99m}Tc as radiotracer or diagnostic tool. As a consequence the demand for ^{99m}Tc grew exponentially and by 1966, Brookhaven National Laboratory was unable to cope with the demand. Production and distribution of ^{99m}Tc generators were transferred to private companies. "TechneKow-CS generator", the first commercial ^{99m}Tc generator, was produced by Nuclear Consultants, Inc. (St. Louis, Missouri) and Union Carbide Nuclear Corporation (Tuxedo, New York). From 1967 to 1984, ^{99}Mo was produced for Mallinckrodt Nuclear Company at the Missouri University Research Reactor (MURR).

Union Carbide actively developed a process to produce and separate useful isotopes like ^{99}Mo from mixed fission products that resulted from the irradiation of highly enriched uranium (HEU) targets in nuclear reactors developed from 1968 to 1972 at the Cintichem facility (formerly the Union Carbide Research Center built in the Sterling forest in Tuxedo, New York (41°14′6.88″N 74°12′50.78″W)). The Cintichem process originally used 93% highly enriched U-235 deposited as UO_{2} on the inside of a cylindrical target.

At the end of the 1970s, 200,000 Ci (7.4×10^{15} Bq) of total fission product radiation were extracted weekly from 20 to 30 reactor bombarded HEU capsules, using the so-called "Cintichem [chemical isolation] process." The research facility with its 1961 5-MW pool-type research reactor was later sold to Hoffman-LaRoche and became Cintichem Inc. In 1980, Cintichem, Inc. began the production/isolation of ^{99}Mo in its reactor, and became the single U.S. producer of ^{99}Mo during the 1980s. However, in 1989, Cintichem detected an underground leak of radioactive products that led to the reactor shutdown and decommissioning, putting an end to the commercial production of ^{99}Mo in the USA.

The production of ^{99}Mo started in Canada in the early 1970s and was shifted to the NRU reactor in the mid-1970s. By 1978 the reactor provided technetium-99m in large enough quantities that were processed by AECL's radiochemical division, which was privatized in 1988 as Nordion, now MDS Nordion. In the 1990s a substitution for the aging NRU reactor for production of radioisotopes was planned. The Multipurpose Applied Physics Lattice Experiment (MAPLE) was designed as a dedicated isotope-production facility. Initially, two identical MAPLE reactors were to be built at Chalk River Laboratories, each capable of supplying 100% of the world's medical isotope demand. However, problems with the MAPLE 1 reactor, most notably a positive power co-efficient of reactivity, led to the cancellation of the project in 2008.

The first commercial ^{99m}Tc generators were produced in Argentina in 1967, with ^{99}Mo produced in the CNEA's RA-1 Enrico Fermi reactor. Besides its domestic market CNEA supplies ^{99}Mo to some South American countries.

==== Oceania ====
In 1967, the first ^{99m}Tc procedures were carried out in Auckland, New Zealand. ^{99}Mo was initially supplied by Amersham, UK, then by the Australian Nuclear Science and Technology Organisation (ANSTO) in Lucas Heights, Australia.

==== Europe ====
In May 1963, Scheer and Maier-Borst were the first to introduce the use of ^{99m}Tc for medical applications. In 1968, Philips-Duphar (later Mallinckrodt, today Covidien) marketed the first technetium-99m generator produced in Europe and distributed from Petten, the Netherlands.

=== Shortage ===
Global shortages of technetium-99m emerged in the late 2000s because two aging nuclear reactors (NRU and HFR) that provided about two-thirds of the world's supply of molybdenum-99, which itself has a half-life of only 2.75 days, were shut down repeatedly for extended maintenance periods. In May 2009, the Atomic Energy of Canada Limited announced the detection of a small leak of heavy water in the NRU reactor that remained out of service until completion of the repairs in August 2010.

After the observation of gas bubble jets released from one of the deformations of primary cooling water circuits in August 2008, the HFR reactor was stopped for a thorough safety investigation. NRG received in February 2009 a temporary license to operate HFR only when necessary for medical radioisotope production. HFR stopped for repairs at the beginning of 2010 and was restarted in September 2010.

Two replacement Canadian reactors (see MAPLE Reactor) constructed in the 1990s were closed before beginning operation, for safety reasons. A construction permit for a new production facility to be built in Columbia, MO was issued in May 2018.

== Nuclear properties ==
Technetium-99m is a metastable nuclear isomer, as indicated by the "m" after its mass number 99. This means it is a nuclide in an excited (metastable) state that lasts much longer than is typical. The nucleus will eventually relax (i.e., de-excite) to its ground state through the emission of gamma rays or internal conversion electrons. These decays do not change the number of protons or neutrons, but only give them a lower-energy 'arrangement', which here is the ground state.

The excitation energy above the ground state is 142.7 keV, but 99% of the time, it relaxes first to a slightly lower state (140.5 keV) by internal conversion (and the rate of this transition determines the uncertainty in half-life), which decays at once. In total, ^{99m}Tc decays about 89% by gamma emission (^{99m}Tc → ^{99}Tc + γ) and almost all of the time, this results in a 140.5 keV gamma ray and only rarely in a 142.7 keV (1 in 4,000) as the latter decay, too, is very largely converted. The remaining 11% of decays are completed entirely by conversion and not of diagnostic utility, though still contributing to internal radiation dose.

These gammas are the radiations that are picked up by a gamma camera when ^{99m}Tc is used as a radioactive tracer for medical imaging. Pure gamma emission is the desirable decay mode for medical imaging because other particles deposit more energy in the patient body (radiation dose) relatively to that in the camera. Metastable isomeric transition is the only nuclear decay mode that approaches pure gamma emission.

^{99m}Tc's half-life of 6.0066 hours is considerably longer (by 14 orders of magnitude, at least) than most nuclear isomers, though not unique. This is still a short half-life relative to many other known modes of radioactive decay and it is in the middle of the range of half-lives for radiopharmaceuticals used for medical imaging.

After gamma emission or internal conversion, the resulting ground-state technetium-99 then decays with a half-life of 211,000 years to stable ruthenium-99. This process emits soft beta radiation and no gamma; the radiation for this is comparatively insignificant because of the long half-life ratio and such low residual radioactivity is a desirable feature for radiopharmaceuticals.

== Production ==
=== Production of ^{99}Mo in nuclear reactors ===
==== Neutron irradiation of uranium-235 targets ====
The parent nuclide of ^{99m}Tc, ^{99}Mo, is mainly extracted for medical purposes from the fission products created in neutron-irradiated uranium-235 targets, the majority of which is produced in five nuclear research reactors around the world using highly enriched uranium (HEU) targets. Smaller amounts of ^{99}Mo are produced from low-enriched uranium in at least three reactors.

Nuclear reactors producing ^{99}Mo from ^{235}U targets. The year indicates the date of the first criticality of the reactor.
| Type | Reactor | Location | Target/Fuel | Year |
|---|---|---|---|---|
| Large-scale producers | NRU (Decommissioned) | Canada | HEU/LEU | 1957 |
| Large-scale producers | BR2 | Belgium | HEU/HEU | 1961 |
| Large-scale producers | SAFARI-1 | South Africa | LEU/LEU | 1965 |
| Large-scale producers | HFR | the Netherlands | HEU/LEU | 1961 |
| Large-scale producers | Osiris reactor (decommissioned 2015) | France | LEU/HEU | 1966 |
| Regional producers | OPAL | Australia | LEU/LEU | 2006 |
| Regional producers | MPR RSG-GAS | Indonesia | LEU/LEU | 1987 |
| Regional producers | RA-3 | Argentina | LEU/LEU | 1961 |
| Regional producers | MARIA | Poland | HEU/HEU | 1974 |
| Regional producers | LVR-15 | Czech Republic | HEU/HEU | 1957 |

==== Neutron activation of ^{98}Mo ====
Production of ^{99}Mo by neutron activation of natural molybdenum, or molybdenum enriched in ^{98}Mo, is another, smaller, route of production. This was the original method, and gives a radio-pure product, but the large amount of remaining stable molybdenum complicates generator design.

=== Production of ^{99m}Tc/^{99}Mo in particle accelerators ===
==== Production of "Instant" ^{99m}Tc ====
The feasibility of ^{99m}Tc production with the 22-MeV-proton bombardment of a ^{100}Mo target in medical cyclotrons was demonstrated in 1971. The recent shortages of ^{99m}Tc reignited the interest in the production of "instant" ^{99m}Tc by proton bombardment of isotopically enriched ^{100}Mo targets (>99.5%) following the reaction ^{100}Mo(p,2n)^{99m}Tc. Canada is commissioning such cyclotrons, designed by Advanced Cyclotron Systems, for ^{99m}Tc production at the University of Alberta and the Université de Sherbrooke, and is planning others at the University of British Columbia, TRIUMF, University of Saskatchewan and Lakehead University.

A particular drawback of cyclotron production via (p,2n) on ^{100}Mo is the significant co-production of ^{99g}Tc. The preferential in-growth of this nuclide occurs due to the larger reaction cross-section pathway leading to the ground state, which is almost five times higher at the cross-section maximum in comparison with the metastable one at the same energy. Depending on the time required to process the target material and recovery of ^{99m}Tc, the amount of ^{99m}Tc relative to ^{99g}Tc will continue to decrease, in turn reducing the specific activity of ^{99m}Tc available. It has been reported that ingrowth of ^{99g}Tc as well as the presence of other Tc isotopes can negatively affect subsequent labelling and/or imaging; however, the use of high purity ^{100}Mo targets, specified proton beam energies, and appropriate time of use have shown to be sufficient for yielding ^{99m}Tc from a cyclotron comparable to that from a commercial generator. Liquid metal molybdenum-containing targets have been proposed that would aid in streamlined processing, ensuring better production yields. A particular problem associated with the continued reuse of recycled, enriched ^{100}Mo targets is unavoidable transmutation of the target as other Mo isotopes are generated during irradiation and cannot be easily removed post-processing.

==== Indirect routes of production of ^{99}Mo ====
Other particle accelerator-based isotope production techniques have been investigated. The supply disruptions of ^{99}Mo in the late 2000s and the ageing of the producing nuclear reactors forced the industry to look into alternative methods of production. The use of cyclotrons or electron accelerators to produce ^{99}Mo from ^{100}Mo via (p,pn) or (γ,n) reactions, respectively, has been further investigated. The (n,2n) reaction on ^{100}Mo yields a higher reaction cross-section for high energy neutrons than of (n,γ) on ^{98}Mo with thermal neutrons. In particular, this method requires accelerators that generate fast neutron spectrums, such as ones using D-T or other fusion-based reactions, or high energy spallation or knock out reactions. A disadvantage of these techniques is the necessity for enriched ^{100}Mo targets, which are significantly more expensive than natural isotopic targets and typically require recycling of the material, which can be costly, time-consuming, and arduous.

=== Technetium-99m generators ===
Technetium-99m's short half-life of 6 hours makes storage impossible and would make transport expensive (not impossible; fluorine-18 with its shorter life is transported). Instead, its parent nuclide ^{99}Mo is supplied to hospitals after its extraction from the neutron-irradiated uranium targets and its purification in dedicated processing facilities. (Note: The ^{99}Tc formed by decay of ^{99}Mo and ^{99m}Tc during the time of the processing is removed, together its isomer ^{99m}Tc, at the end of the manufacturing process of the generator.) It is shipped by specialised radiopharmaceutical companies in the form of technetium-99m generators worldwide or directly distributed to the local market. The generators, colloquially known as moly cows, are devices designed to provide radiation shielding for transport and to minimize the extraction work done at the medical facility. A typical dose rate at 1 metre from the ^{99m}Tc generator is 20-50 μSv/h during transport. These generators' output declines with time and they must be replaced weekly, since the half-life of ^{99}Mo is still only 66 hours.

Molybdenum-99 spontaneously decays to excited states of ^{99}Tc through beta decay. Over 87% of the decays lead to the desired ^{99m}Tc. A β^{−} electron and a ν̅_{e} electron antineutrino are emitted in the process (^{99}Mo → ^{99m}Tc + β^{−} + ν̅_{e}). The β^{−} electrons are easily shielded for transport, and ^{99m}Tc generators are only minor radiation hazards, mostly due to secondary X-rays produced by the electrons (also known as bremsstrahlung).

At the hospital, the ^{99m}Tc that forms through ^{99}Mo decay is chemically extracted from the technetium-99m generator. Most commercial ^{99}Mo/^{99m}Tc generators use column chromatography, in which ^{99}Mo in the form of water-soluble molybdate, MoO_{4}^{2−} is adsorbed onto acid alumina (Al_{2}O_{3}). When the ^{99}Mo decays, it forms pertechnetate TcO_{4}^{−}, which, because of its single charge, is less tightly bound to the alumina. Pulling normal saline solution through the column of immobilized ^{99}MoO_{4}^{2−} elutes the soluble ^{99m}TcO_{4}^{−}, resulting in a saline solution containing the ^{99m}Tc as the dissolved sodium salt of the pertechnetate. One technetium-99m generator, holding only a few micrograms of ^{99}Mo, can potentially diagnose 10,000 patients because it will be producing ^{99m}Tc strongly for over a week.

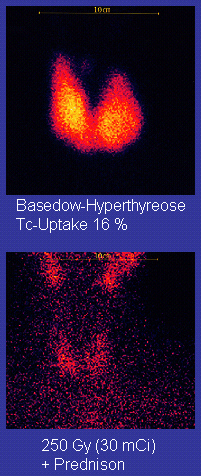
Technetium scintigraphy of a neck of a Graves' disease patient

=== Preparation ===
Technetium exits the generator in the form of the pertechnetate ion, TcO_{4}^{−}. The oxidation state of Tc in this compound is +7. This is directly suitable for medical applications only in bone scans (it is taken up by osteoblasts) and some thyroid scans (it is taken up in place of iodine by normal thyroid tissues). In other types of scans relying on ^{99m}Tc, a reducing agent is added to the pertechnetate solution to bring the oxidation state of the technecium down to +3 or +4. Secondly, a ligand is added to form a coordination complex. The ligand is chosen to have an affinity for the specific organ to be targeted. For example, the exametazime complex of Tc in oxidation state +3 is able to cross the blood–brain barrier and flow through the vessels in the brain for cerebral blood flow imaging. Other ligands include sestamibi for myocardial perfusion imaging and mercapto acetyl triglycine for MAG3 scan to measure renal function.

== Medical uses ==
In 1970, Eckelman and Richards presented the first "kit" containing all the ingredients required to release the ^{99m}Tc, "milked" from the generator, in the chemical form to be administered to the patient.

Technetium-99m is used in 20 million diagnostic nuclear medical procedures every year. Approximately 85% of diagnostic imaging procedures in nuclear medicine use this isotope as radioactive tracer. Klaus Schwochau's book Technetium lists 31 radiopharmaceuticals based on ^{99m}Tc for imaging and functional studies of the brain, myocardium, thyroid, lungs, liver, gallbladder, kidneys, skeleton, blood, and tumors. A more recent review is also available.

Depending on the procedure, the ^{99m}Tc is tagged (or bound to) a pharmaceutical that transports it to its required location. For example, when ^{99m}Tc is chemically bound to exametazime (HMPAO), the drug is able to cross the blood–brain barrier and flow through the vessels in the brain for cerebral blood-flow imaging. This combination is also used for labeling white blood cells (^{99m}Tc labeled WBC) to visualize sites of infection. ^{99m}Tc sestamibi is used for myocardial perfusion imaging, which shows how well the blood flows through the heart. Imaging to measure renal function is done by attaching ^{99m}Tc to mercaptoacetyl triglycine (MAG3); this procedure is known as a MAG3 scan.

Technetium-99m (Tc-99m) can be readily detected in the body by medical equipment because it emits 140.5 keV gamma rays (these are about the same wavelength as emitted by conventional X-ray diagnostic equipment), and its half-life for gamma emission is six hours (meaning 94% of it decays to ^{99}Tc in 24 hours). Besides, it emits virtually no beta radiation, thus keeping radiation dosage low. Its decay product, ^{99}Tc, has a relatively long half-life (211,000 years) and emits little radiation. The short physical half-life of ^{99m}Tc and its biological half-life of 1 day with its other favourable properties allows scanning procedures to collect data rapidly and keep total patient radiation exposure low. Chemically, technetium-99m is selectively concentrated in the stomach, thyroid, and salivary glands, and excluded from cerebrospinal fluid; combining it with perchlorate abolishes its selectiveness.

=== Radiation side-effects ===
Diagnostic treatment involving technetium-99m will result in radiation exposure to technicians, patients, and passers-by. Typical quantities of technetium administered for immunoscintigraphy tests, such as SPECT tests, range from 400 to 1,100 MBq (11 to 30 mCi) (millicurie or mCi; and Mega-Becquerel or MBq) for adults. These doses result in radiation exposures to the patient around 10 mSv (1000 mrem), the equivalent of about 500 chest X-ray exposures. This level of radiation exposure is estimated by the linear no-threshold model to carry a 1 in 1000 lifetime risk of developing a solid cancer or leukemia in the patient. The risk is higher in younger patients, and lower in older ones. Unlike a chest x-ray, the radiation source is inside the patient and will be carried around for a few days, exposing others to second-hand radiation. A spouse who stays constantly by the side of the patient through this time might receive one thousandth of patient's radiation dose this way.

The short half-life of the isotope allows for scanning procedures that collect data rapidly. The isotope is also of a very low energy level for a gamma emitter. Its ~140 keV of energy make it safer for use because of the substantially reduced ionization compared with other gamma emitters. The energy of gammas from ^{99m}Tc is about the same as the radiation from a commercial diagnostic X-ray machine, although the number of gammas emitted results in radiation doses more comparable to X-ray studies like computed tomography.

Technetium-99m has features that make it safer than other isotopes. Its gamma decay mode can be easily detected by a camera, allowing the use of smaller quantities. And because technetium-99m has a short half-life, its quick decay into the far less radioactive technetium-99 results in relatively low total radiation dose to the patient per unit of initial activity after administration, as compared with other radioisotopes. In the form administered in these medical tests (usually pertechnetate), technetium-99m and technetium-99 are eliminated from the body within a few days.

=== 3-D scanning technique: SPECT ===
Single-photon emission computed tomography (SPECT) is a nuclear medicine imaging technique using gamma rays. It may be used with any gamma-emitting isotope, including ^{99m}Tc. In the use of technetium-99m, the radioisotope is administered to the patient and the escaping gamma rays are incident upon a moving gamma camera which computes and processes the image. To acquire SPECT images, the gamma camera is rotated around the patient. Projections are acquired at defined points during the rotation, typically every three to six degrees. In most cases, a full 360° rotation is used to obtain an optimal reconstruction. The time taken to obtain each projection is also variable, but 15–20 seconds are typical. This gives a total scan time of 15–20 minutes.

The technetium-99m radioisotope is used predominantly in bone and brain scans. For bone scans, the pertechnetate ion is used directly, as it is taken up by osteoblasts attempting to heal a skeletal injury, or (in some cases) as a reaction of these cells to a tumor (either primary or metastatic) in the bone. In brain scanning, ^{99m}Tc is attached to the chelating agent HMPAO to create technetium (^{99m}Tc) exametazime, an agent which localizes in the brain according to region blood flow, making it useful for the detection of stroke and dementing illnesses that decrease regional brain flow and metabolism.

Most recently, technetium-99m scintigraphy has been combined with CT coregistration technology to produce SPECT/CT scans. These employ the same radioligands and have the same uses as SPECT scanning, but are able to provide even finer 3-D localization of high-uptake tissues, in cases where finer resolution is needed. An example is the sestamibi parathyroid scan which is performed using the ^{99m}Tc radioligand sestamibi, and can be done in either SPECT or SPECT/CT machines.

=== Bone scan ===
The nuclear medicine technique commonly called the bone scan usually uses ^{99m}Tc. It is not to be confused with the "bone density scan", DEXA, which is a low-exposure X-ray test measuring bone density to look for osteoporosis and other diseases where bones lose mass without rebuilding activity. The nuclear medicine technique is sensitive to areas of unusual bone rebuilding activity, since the radiopharmaceutical is taken up by osteoblast cells which build bone. The technique therefore is sensitive to fractures and bone reaction to bone tumors, including metastases. For a bone scan, the patient is injected with a small amount of radioactive material, such as 700–1,100 MBq (19–30 mCi) of ^{99m}Tc-medronic acid and then scanned with a gamma camera. Medronic acid is a phosphate derivative which can exchange places with bone phosphate in regions of active bone growth, so anchoring the radioisotope to that specific region. To view small lesions (less than 1 centimetre (0.39 in)) especially in the spine, the SPECT imaging technique may be required, but in the United States most insurance companies require separate authorization for SPECT imaging.

=== Myocardial perfusion imaging ===
Myocardial perfusion imaging (MPI) is a form of functional cardiac imaging, used for the diagnosis of ischemic heart disease. The underlying principle is, under conditions of stress, diseased myocardium receives less blood flow than normal myocardium. MPI is one of several types of cardiac stress test. As a nuclear stress test, the average radiation exposure is 9.4 mSv, which when compared with a typical 2 view chest X-ray (.1 mSv) is equivalent to 94 Chest X-rays.

Several radiopharmaceuticals and radionuclides may be used for this, each giving different information. In the myocardial perfusion scans using ^{99m}Tc, the radiopharmaceuticals ^{99m}Tc-tetrofosmin (Myoview, GE Healthcare) or ^{99m}Tc-sestamibi (Cardiolite, Bristol-Myers Squibb) are used. Following this, myocardial stress is induced, either by exercise or pharmacologically with adenosine, dobutamine or dipyridamole(Persantine), which increase the heart rate or by regadenoson(Lexiscan), a vasodilator. (Aminophylline can be used to reverse the effects of dipyridamole and regadenoson). Scanning may then be performed with a conventional gamma camera, or with SPECT/CT.

=== Cardiac ventriculography ===
In cardiac ventriculography, a radionuclide, usually ^{99m}Tc, is injected, and the heart is imaged to evaluate the flow through it, to evaluate coronary artery disease, valvular heart disease, congenital heart diseases, cardiomyopathy, and other cardiac disorders. As a nuclear stress test, the average radiation exposure is 9.4 mSv, which when compared with a typical 2 view chest X-ray (.1 mSv) is equivalent to 94 Chest X-Rays. It exposes patients to less radiation than comparable chest X-ray studies.

=== Functional brain imaging ===
Usually the gamma-emitting tracer used in functional brain imaging is ^{99m}Tc-HMPAO (hexamethylpropylene amine oxime, exametazime). The similar ^{99m}Tc-EC tracer may also be used. These molecules are preferentially distributed to regions of high brain blood flow, and act to assess brain metabolism regionally, in an attempt to diagnose and differentiate the different causal pathologies of dementia. When used with the 3-D SPECT technique, they compete with brain FDG-PET scans and fMRI brain scans as techniques to map the regional metabolic rate of brain tissue.

=== Sentinel-node identification ===
The radioactive properties of ^{99m}Tc can be used to identify the predominant lymph nodes draining a cancer, such as breast cancer or melanoma. This is usually performed at the time of biopsy or resection.^{99m}Tc-labelled filtered sulfur colloid or Technetium (99mTc) tilmanocept are injected intradermally around the intended biopsy site. The general location of the sentinel node is determined with the use of a handheld scanner with a gamma-sensor probe that detects the technetium-99m–labeled tracer that was previously injected around the biopsy site. An injection of Methylene blue or isosulfan blue is done at the same time to dye any draining nodes visibly blue. An incision is then made over the area of highest radionuclide accumulation, and the sentinel node is identified within the incision by inspection; the isosulfan blue dye will usually stain any lymph nodes blue that are draining from the area around the tumor.

=== Immunoscintigraphy ===
Immunoscintigraphy incorporates ^{99m}Tc into a monoclonal antibody, an immune system protein, capable of binding to cancer cells. A few hours after injection, medical equipment is used to detect the gamma rays emitted by the ^{99m}Tc; higher concentrations indicate where the tumor is. This technique is particularly useful for detecting hard-to-find cancers, such as those affecting the intestines. These modified antibodies are sold by the German company Hoechst (now part of Sanofi-Aventis) under the name Scintimun.

=== Blood pool labeling ===
When ^{99m}Tc is combined with a tin compound, it binds to red blood cells and can therefore be used to map circulatory system disorders. It is commonly used to detect gastrointestinal bleeding sites as well as ejection fraction, heart wall motion abnormalities, abnormal shunting, and to perform ventriculography.

=== Pyrophosphate for heart damage ===
A pyrophosphate ion with ^{99m}Tc adheres to calcium deposits in damaged heart muscle, making it useful to gauge damage after a heart attack.

=== Sulfur colloid for spleen scan ===
The sulfur colloid of ^{99m}Tc is scavenged by the spleen, making it possible to image the structure of the spleen.

=== Meckel's diverticulum ===
Pertechnetate is actively accumulated and secreted by the mucoid cells of the gastric mucosa, and therefore, technetate(VII) radiolabeled with Tc99m is injected into the body when looking for ectopic gastric tissue as is found in a Meckel's diverticulum with Meckel's Scans.

=== Pulmonary ===
Carbon inhalation aerosol labeled with technetium-99m (Technegas) is indicated for the visualization of pulmonary ventilation and the evaluation of pulmonary embolism.

== See also ==
- Cholescintigraphy
- Isotopes of technetium
- Transient equilibrium

== Notes ==
| Lighter: technetium-99 | Technetium-99m is an isotope of technetium | Heavier: technetium-100 |
| Decay product of: molybdenum-99 | Decay chain of technetium-99m | Decays to: technetium-99 |
