= Nomenclature of monoclonal antibodies =

Naming scheme for assigning generic, or nonproprietary, names to monoclonal antibodies

List of stems for monoclonal antibody nomenclature (revision 2022)
Prefix	Target substem		Stem	
		meaning		meaning
variable	-ami-	serum amyloid protein (SAP)/amyloidosis (pre-substem)	-bart	artificial antibody
variable	-ba-	bacterial	-ment	fragment (derived from a variable domain)
variable	-ci-	cardiovascular	-mig	multi-immunoglobulin (e.g. BsMAb)
variable	-de-	metabolic or endocrine pathways	-tug	unmodified immunoglobulin
variable	-eni-	enzyme inhibition		
variable	-fung-	fungal		
variable	-gro-	skeletal muscle mass related growth factors and receptors (pre-substem)		
variable	-ki-	cytokine and cytokine receptor		
variable	-ler-	allergen		
variable	-ne-	neural		
variable	-os-	bone		
variable	-pru-	immunosuppressive		
variable	-sto-	immunostimulatory		
variable	-ta-	tumor		
variable	-toxa-	toxin		
variable	-vet-	veterinary use (sub-stem)		
variable	-vi-	viral		

The nomenclature of monoclonal antibodies is a naming scheme for assigning generic, or nonproprietary, names to monoclonal antibodies. An antibody is a protein that is produced in B cells and used by the immune system of humans and other vertebrate animals to identify a specific foreign object like a bacterium or a virus. Monoclonal antibodies are those that were produced in identical cells, often artificially, and so share the same target object. They have a wide range of applications including medical uses.

This naming scheme is used for both the World Health Organization's International Nonproprietary Names (INN) and the United States Adopted Names (USAN) for pharmaceuticals. In general, word stems are used to identify classes of drugs, in most cases placed word-finally. All monoclonal antibody names assigned until 2021 end with the stem -mab; newer names have different stems. Unlike most other pharmaceuticals, monoclonal antibody nomenclature uses different preceding word parts (morphemes) depending on structure and function. These are officially called substems and sometimes erroneously infixes, even by the USAN Council itself.

The scheme has been revised several times: in 2009, in 2017, in 2021, and in 2022.

== Components ==
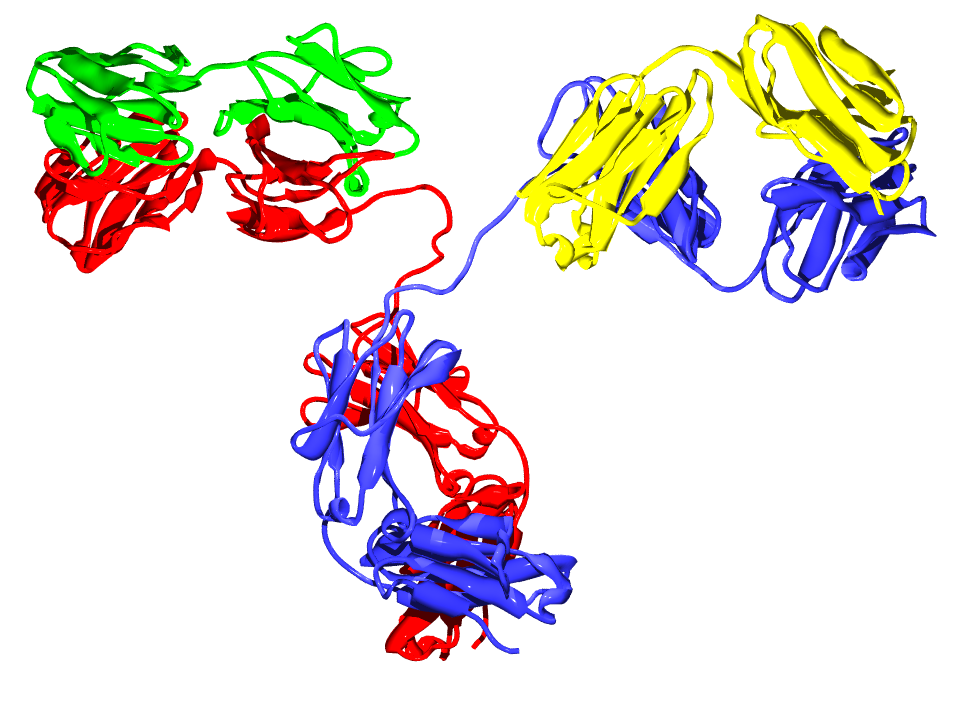
Structure (ribbon diagram) of an antibody. The four variable domains are the outermost clusters shown top left and top right. The Fc region is the cluster at the bottom.

=== Stem ===
Until 2021, the stem -mab was used for all monoclonal antibodies as well as for their fragments, as long as at least one variable domain (the domain that contains the target binding structure) was included. This is the case for antigen-binding fragments and single-chain variable fragments, among other artificial proteins.

The new scheme, published in November 2021, divides antibodies into four groups:

1. Group 1 uses the stem -tug for full-length unmodified immunoglobulins, those that might occur as such in the immune system.
2. Group 2 has the stem -bart for full-length antibodies artificial, which contain one or more engineered regions (at least one point mutation).
3. Group 3 uses -mig for multi-immunoglobulins of any length, comprising bispecific (including BiKEs, BiTEs) multispecific monoclonal antibodies (including TriKEs).
4. Group 4 assigns the stem -ment for monospecific antibody fragments without an Fc region. Examples include Fab, F(ab')2 and scFv.

Other antibody parts (such as Fc regions), antibody mimetics, and fusion proteins use different naming schemes.

=== Substem for source ===
Source substems: sketches of mouse (top left), chimeric (top right), humanized (bottom left), chimeric/humanized (bottom middle), and human (bottom right) monoclonal antibodies. Human parts are shown in brown, non-human parts in blue. The variable domains are the boxes on top of each antibody; the CDRs within these domains are represented as triple loops.

For antibodies named until early 2017, the substem preceding the stem denotes the animal from which the antibody was obtained. The first monoclonal antibodies were produced in mice (substem -o-, yielding the ending -omab; usually Mus musculus, the house mouse) or other non-human organisms. Neither INN nor USAN has ever been requested for antibodies from rats (theoretically -a-), hamsters (-e-) and primates (-i-).

These non-human antibodies are recognized as foreign by the human immune system and may be rapidly cleared from the body, provoke an allergic reaction, or both. To avoid this, parts of the antibody can be replaced with human amino acid sequences, or pure human antibodies can be engineered. If the constant region is replaced with the human form, the antibody is termed chimeric and the substem used was -xi-. Part of the variable regions may also be substituted, in which case it is called humanized and -zu- was used; typically, everything is replaced except the complementarity-determining regions (CDRs), the three loops of amino acid sequences at the outside of each variable region that bind to the target structure; although some other residues may have to remain non-human in order to achieve good binding. Partly chimeric and partly humanized antibodies used -xizu-. These three substems did not indicate the foreign species used for production. Thus, the human/mouse chimeric antibody basiliximab ends in -ximab just as does the human/macaque antibody gomiliximab. Purely human antibodies used -u-.

Rat/mouse hybrid antibodies can be engineered with binding sites for two different antigens. These drugs, termed trifunctional antibodies, had the substem -axo-.

Newer antibody names omit this part of the name.

=== Substem for target ===
The substem preceding the source of the antibody refers to the medicine's target. Examples of targets are tumors, organ systems like the circulatory system, or infectious agents like bacteria or viruses. The term target does not imply what sort of action the antibody exerts. Therapeutic, prophylactic and diagnostic agents are not distinguished by this nomenclature.

In the naming scheme as originally developed, these substems mostly consist of a consonant, a vowel, then another consonant. The final letter may be dropped if the resulting name would be difficult to pronounce otherwise. Examples include -ci(r)- for the circulatory system, -li(m)- for the immune system (lim stands for lymphocyte) and -ne(r)- for the nervous system. The final letter is usually omitted if the following source substem begins with a consonant (such as -zu- or -xi-), but not all target substems are used in their shortened form. -mul-, for example, is never reduced to -mu- because no chimeric or humanized antibodies targeting the musculoskeletal system ever received an INN. Combination of target and source substems resulted in endings like -limumab (immune system, human) or -ciximab (circulatory system, chimeric, consonant r dropped).

New and shorter target substems were adopted in 2009. They mostly consist of a consonant, plus a vowel which is omitted if the source substem begins with a vowel. For example, human antibodies targeting the immune system receive names ending in -lumab instead of the old -limumab. Some endings like -ciximab remained unchanged. The old system employed seven different substems for tumor targets, depending on the type of tumor. Because many antibodies are investigated for several tumor types, the new convention only has -t(u)-.

With the source substem being discontinued in 2017, the need for dropping the target substem's final vowel disappeared.

=== Prefix ===
The prefix carries no special meaning. It should be unique for each medicine and contribute to a well-sounding name. This means that antibodies with the same source and target substems are only distinguished by their prefix. Even antibodies targeting exactly the same structure are differently prefixed, such as the adalimumab and golimumab, both of which are TNF inhibitors but differ in their chemical structure.

=== Additional words ===
A second word following the name of the antibody indicates that another substance is attached, which is done for several reasons.

- An antibody can be PEGylated (attached to molecules of polyethylene glycol) to slow down its degradation by enzymes and to decrease its immunogenicity; this is shown by the word pegol as in alacizumab pegol.
- A cytotoxic agent can be linked to an anti-tumor antibody for drug targeting purposes. The word vedotin, for example, stands for monomethyl auristatin E which is toxic by itself but predominantly affects cancer cells if used in conjugates like glembatumumab vedotin.
- A chelator for binding a radioisotope can be attached. Pendetide, a derivative of pentetic acid, is used for example in capromab pendetide to chelate indium-111. If the drug contains a radioisotope, the name of the isotope precedes the name of the antibody. Consequently, indium (^{111}In) capromab pendetide is the name for the above example including indium-111.

=== Overview ===
List of stems for monoclonal antibody nomenclature
Prefix	Target substem						Source substem (until 2017)		Stem		
	~1993	2009–2017	2017–2021	from 2021	meaning			meaning	old	from 2021	meaning
variable	—	-ami-	-ami-	-ami-	serum amyloid protein (SAP)/amyloidosis (pre-substem)		-a-	rat	-mab	-bart	artificial antibody
variable	-anibi-	—	—	—	angiogenesis (inhibitor)		-e-	hamster	-mab	-ment	fragment (derived from a variable domain)
variable	-ba(c)-	-b(a)-	-ba-	-ba-	bacterial		-i-	primate	-mab	-mig	multi-immunoglobulin (e.g. BsMAb)
variable	-ci(r)-	-c(i)-	-ci-	-ci-	cardiovascular		-o-	mouse	-mab	-tug	unmodified immunoglobulin
variable	-d(e)-	-d(e)- (Note: not mentioned in documents of the 2010s)	-de-	-de-	endocrine		-u-	human			
variable	—	—	-eni- (Note: introduced between 2017 and 2021)	-eni-	enzyme inhibition		-xi-	chimeric (human/foreign)			
variable	-fung-	-f(u)-	-fung-	-fung-	fungal		-zu-	humanized			
variable	-gr(o)-	-gros-	-gros-	-gro- (Note: changed in 2019 from -gros- to -gro- to avoid naming conflicts with -os-)	skeletal muscle mass related growth factors and receptors (pre-substem)		-xizu-	chimeric/humanized hybrid			
variable	-ki(n)-	-k(i)-	-ki-	-ki-	formerly: interleukin; from 2020: cytokine and cytokine receptor		-axo-	rat/mouse hybrid (see trifunctional antibody)			
variable	-les-	—	—	—	inflammatory lesions		-axo-	rat/mouse hybrid (see trifunctional antibody)			
variable	-li(m)-	-l(i)-	-li-	-ler-	immunomodulating	allergen	-vet-	veterinary use (pre-substem) (Note: can be inserted between target substem and stem, as in lo-ki-vet-mab (This part of the name was originally listed under the source substems and moved to the target substems when the former were dropped in 2017.))			
variable	-li(m)-	-l(i)-	-li-	-pru-	immunomodulating	immunosuppressive					
variable	-li(m)-	-l(i)-	-li-	-sto-	immunomodulating	immunostimulatory					
variable	-mul-	—	—	—	musculoskeletal system						
variable	-ne(u)(r)-	-n(e)-	-ne-	-ne-	neural (nervous system)						
variable	-os-	-s(o)-	-os-	-os-	bone						
variable	-co(l)-	-t(u)-	-ta-	-ta-	colonic tumor	tumor					
variable	-go(t)-	-t(u)-	-ta-	-ta-	testicular tumor	tumor					
variable	-go(v)-	-t(u)-	-ta-	-ta-	ovarian tumor	tumor					
variable	-ma(r)-	-t(u)-	-ta-	-ta-	mammary tumor	tumor					
variable	-me(l)-	-t(u)-	-ta-	-ta-	melanoma	tumor					
variable	-pr(o)-	-t(u)-	-ta-	-ta-	prostate tumor	tumor					
variable	-tu(m)-	-t(u)-	-ta-	-ta-	miscellaneous tumor	tumor					
variable	-toxa-	-tox(a)-	-toxa-	-toxa-	toxin						
variable	—	—	-vet-	-vet-	veterinary use (pre-stem)						
variable	-vi(r)-	-v(i)-	-vi-	-vi-	viral						

== History ==
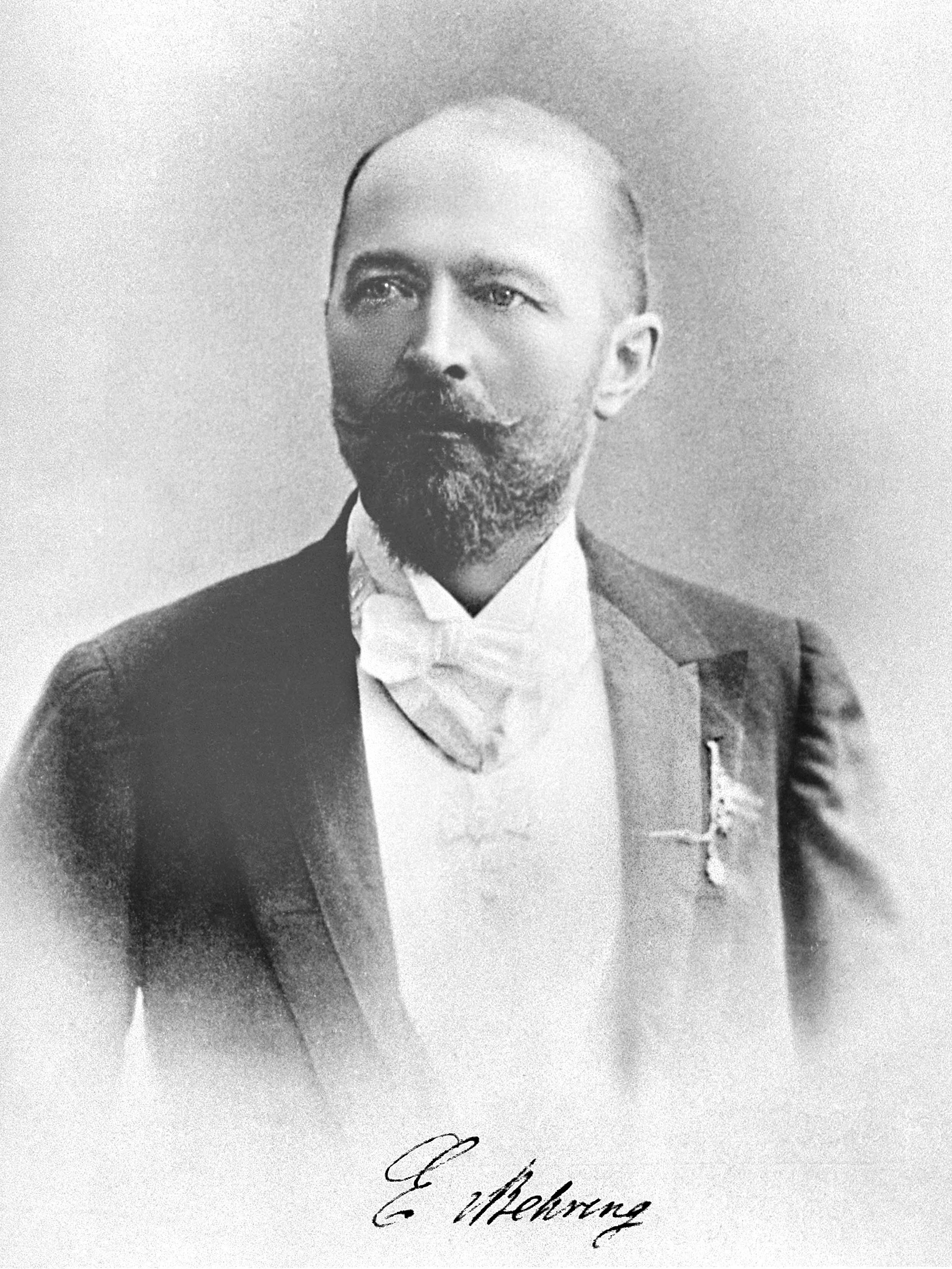
Emil von Behring, one of the discoverers of antibodies

Emil von Behring and Kitasato Shibasaburō discovered in 1890 that diphtheria and tetanus toxins were neutralized in the bloodstream of animals by substances they called antitoxins, which were specific for the respective toxin. Behring received the first Nobel Prize in Physiology or Medicine for their find in 1901. A year after the discovery, Paul Ehrlich used the term antibodies (German Antikörper) for these antitoxins.

The principle of monoclonal antibody production, called hybridoma technology, was published in 1975 by Georges Köhler and César Milstein, who were awarded the 1984 Medicine Nobel Prize for their discovery together with Niels Kaj Jerne. Muromonab-CD3 was the first monoclonal antibody to be approved for clinical use in humans, in 1986.

The World Health Organization (WHO) introduced the system of International Nonproprietary Names in 1950, with the first INN list being published three years later. The stem -mab for monoclonal antibodies was proposed around 1990, and the current system with target and source substems was developed between 1991 and 1993. Due to the collaboration between the WHO and the United States Adopted Names Council, antibody USANs have the same structure and are largely identical to INNs. Until 2009, more than 170 monoclonal antibodies received names following this nomenclature.

In October 2008, the WHO convoked a working group to revise the nomenclature of monoclonal antibodies, to meet challenges discussed in April the same year. This led to the adoption of the new target substems in November 2009. In spring 2010, the first new antibody names were adopted.

In April 2017, at the WHO's 64th Consultation on International Nonproprietary Names for Pharmaceutical Substances, it was decided to drop the source substem and from that meeting onwards, it is no longer used in new antibody names. The revised nomenclature was published in May 2017. The difficulty in capturing the complexity and subtleties of the many methods by which antibody drugs can be produced is one of the reasons that the INN dropped the source substem, as is the need for creating more clearly distinguishable names.

The 2021 revision, published in November 2021, replaced the hitherto universal stem -mab with four distinct stems depending on the basic structure. Also, the target substem -li- for immunomodulating antibodies was split into substems for immunosuppressive (-pru-) and immunostimulatory antibodies (-sto-) and those targeting allergens (-ler-).

== Examples ==
=== 1980s ===
- The monoclonal antibody muromonab-CD3, approved for clinical use in 1986, was named before these conventions took effect, and consequently its name does not follow them. Instead, it is a contraction from "murine monoclonal antibody targeting CD3".

=== Convention until 2009 ===
- Adalimumab is a drug targeting TNF alpha. Its name can be broken down into ada-lim-u-mab. Therefore, the drug is a human monoclonal antibody targeting the immune system. If adalimumab had been named between 2009 and 2017, it would have been adalumab (ada-l~~i~~-u-mab). After 2017, it would be adalimab (ada-li-mab).
- Abciximab is a commonly used medication to prevent platelets from clumping together. Broken down into ab-ci-xi-mab, its name shows the drug to be a chimeric monoclonal antibody used on the cardiovascular system. This and the following two names would look the same if the 2009 convention were applied.
- The name of the breast cancer medication trastuzumab can be analyzed as tras-tu-zu-mab. Therefore, the drug is a humanized monoclonal antibody used against a tumor.
- Alacizumab pegol is a PEGylated humanized antibody targeting the circulatory system.
- Technetium (^{99m}Tc) pintumomab and technetium (^{99m}Tc) nofetumomab merpentan are radiolabeled antibodies, merpentan being a chelator that links the antibody nofetumomab to the radioisotope technetium-99m.
- Rozrolimupab is a polyclonal antibody. Broken down into rozro-lim-u-pab, its name shows the drug to be a human polyclonal antibody (-pab) acting on the immune system.

=== Convention from 2009 to 2017 ===
- Olaratumab is an antineoplastic. Its name is composed of the components olara-t-u-mab. This shows that the drug is a human monoclonal antibody acting against tumors.
- The name of benralizumab, a drug designed for the treatment of asthma, has the components benra-li-zu-mab, marking it as a humanized antibody acting on the immune system.

=== Convention from 2017 to 2021 ===
- Belantamab mafodotin (belan-ta-mab) is also an antineoplastic. It is conjugated to a cytotoxic agent that is chemically related to monomethyl auristatin E.

== See also ==
- List of monoclonal antibodies
- Monoclonal antibody therapy
