= Bone scintigraphy =

Nuclear medicine imaging technique

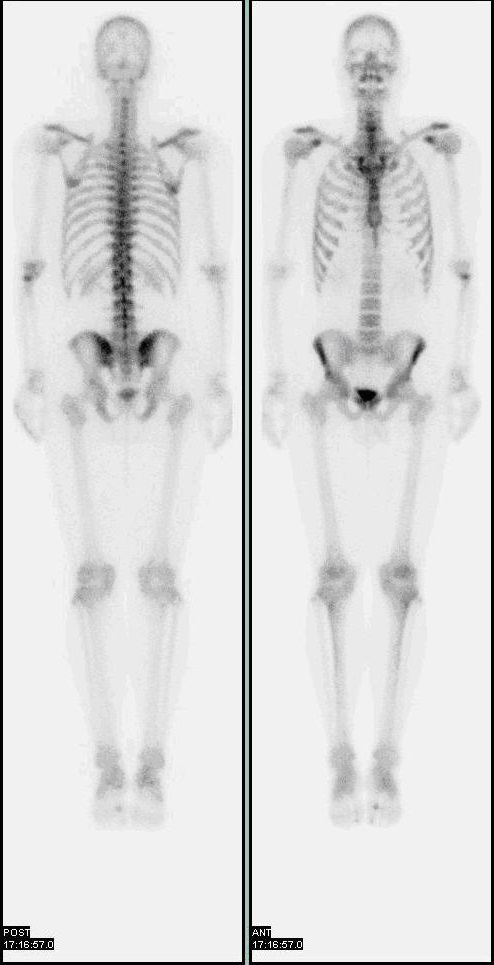
- A nuclear medicine whole-body bone scan. The nuclear medicine whole-body bone scan is generally used in evaluations of various bone-related pathology, such as for bone pain, stress fracture, nonmalignant bone lesions, bone infections, or the spread of cancer to the bone.
- ICD-9-CM: 92.14
- OPS-301 code: 3-705
- MedlinePlus: 003833

A bone scan or bone scintigraphy /sɪnˈtɪɡrəfi/ is a nuclear medicine imaging technique used to help diagnose and assess different bone diseases. These include cancer of the bone or metastasis, location of bone inflammation and fractures (that may not be visible in traditional X-ray images), and bone infection (osteomyelitis).

Nuclear medicine provides functional imaging and allows visualisation of bone metabolism or bone remodeling, which most other imaging techniques (such as X-ray computed tomography, CT) cannot. Bone scintigraphy competes with positron emission tomography (PET) for imaging of abnormal metabolism in bones, but is considerably less expensive. Bone scintigraphy has higher sensitivity but lower specificity than CT or MRI for diagnosis of scaphoid fractures following negative plain radiography.

== History ==
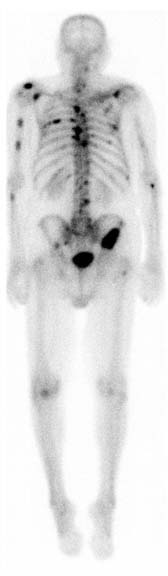
Bone scan showing multiple bone metastases from prostate cancer.

Some of the earliest investigations into skeletal metabolism were carried out by George de Hevesy in the 1930s, using phosphorus-32 and by Charles Pecher in the 1940s.

In the 1950s and 1960s calcium-45 was investigated, but as a beta emitter proved difficult to image. Imaging of positron and gamma emitters such as fluorine-18 and isotopes of strontium with rectilinear scanners was more useful. Use of technetium-99m (^{99m}Tc) labelled phosphates, diphosphonates or similar agents, as in the modern technique, was first proposed in 1971.

== Principle ==
The most common radiopharmaceutical for bone scintigraphy is ^{99m}Tc with methylene diphosphonate (MDP). Other bone radiopharmaceuticals include ^{99m}Tc with HDP, HMDP and DPD. MDP adsorbs onto the crystalline hydroxyapatite mineral of bone. Mineralisation occurs at osteoblasts, representing sites of bone growth, where MDP (and other diphosphates) "bind to the hydroxyapatite crystals in proportion to local blood flow and osteoblastic activity and are therefore markers of bone turnover and bone perfusion".

The more active the bone turnover, the more radioactive material will be seen. Some tumors, fractures and infections show up as areas of increased uptake.

Note that the technique depends on the osteoblastic activity during remodelling and repair processes following initial osteolytic activity. This leads to a limitation of the applicability of this imaging technique with diseases not featuring this osteoblastic (reactive) activity, for example with multiple myeloma. Scintigraphic images remain falsely negative for a long period of time and therefore have only limited diagnostic value. In these cases CT or MRI scans are preferred for diagnosis and staging.

Bone scintigraphy is useful in non-osseous disease. It has emerged as the standard non-invasive method of diagnosing cardiac amyloidosis, in the United States with technetium pyrophosphate, and with other technetium compounds in Europe. It has been hypothesized that micro-calcifications in the amyloid heart are avid for the tracer.

== Technique ==
In a typical bone scan technique, the patient is injected (usually into a vein in the arm or hand, occasionally the foot) with up to 740 MBq of technetium-99m-MDP and then scanned with a gamma camera, which captures planar anterior and posterior or single photon emission computed tomography (SPECT) images. In order to view small lesions SPECT imaging technique may be preferred over planar scintigraphy.

In a single phase protocol (skeletal imaging alone), which will primarily highlight osteoblasts, images are usually acquired 2–5 hours after the injection (after four hours 50–60% of the activity will be fixed to bones). A two or three phase protocol utilises additional scans at different points after the injection to obtain additional diagnostic information. A dynamic (i.e. multiple acquired frames) study immediately after the injection captures perfusion information. A second phase "blood pool" image following the perfusion (if carried out in a three phase technique) can help to diagnose inflammatory conditions or problems of blood supply.

A typical effective dose obtained during a bone scan is 6.3 millisieverts (mSv).

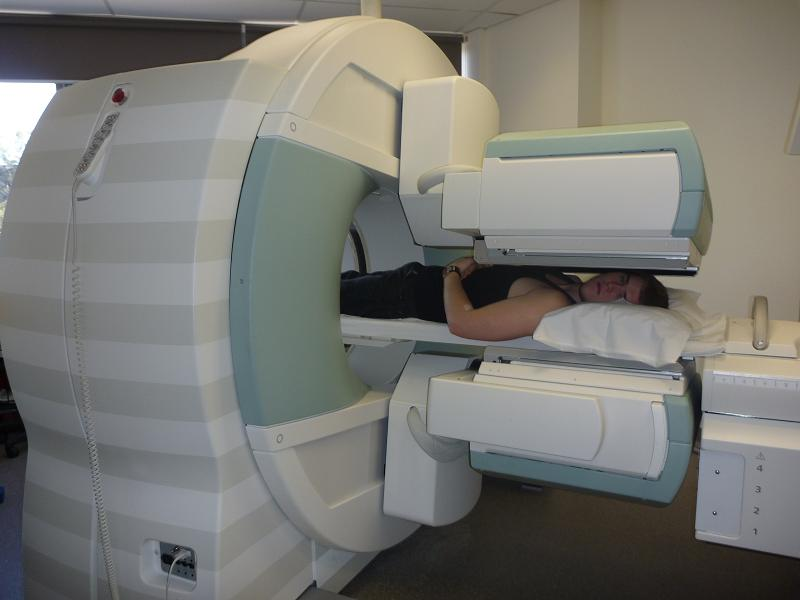
Person undergoing a bone scan on the skull

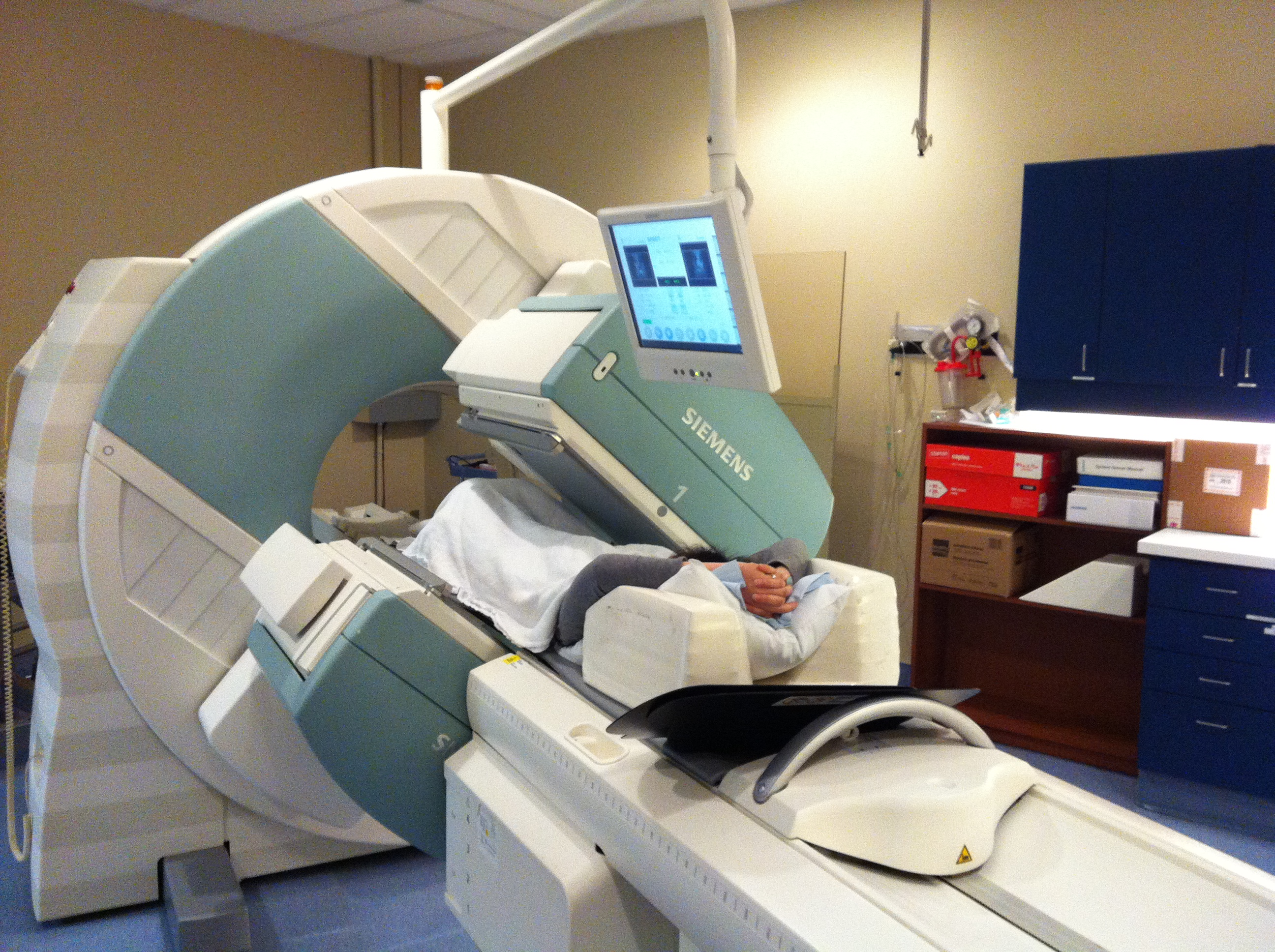
A patient undergoing a SPECT bone scan.

== PET bone imaging ==
Although bone scintigraphy generally refers to gamma camera imaging of ^{99m}Tc radiopharmaceuticals, imaging with positron emission tomography (PET) scanners is also possible, using fluorine-18 sodium fluoride ([^{18}F]NaF).

For quantitative measurements, ^{99m}Tc-MDP has some advantages over [^{18}F]NaF. MDP renal clearance is not affected by urine flow rate and simplified data analysis can be employed which assumes steady state conditions. It has negligible tracer uptake in red blood cells, therefore correction for plasma to whole blood ratios is not required unlike [^{18}F]NaF. However, disadvantages include higher rates of protein binding (from 25% immediately after injection to 70% after 12 hours leading to the measurement of freely available MDP over time), and less diffusibility due to higher molecular weight than [^{18}F]NaF, leading to lower capillary permeability.

There are several advantages of the PET technique, which are common to PET imaging in general, including improved spatial resolution and more developed attenuation correction techniques. Patient experience is improved as imaging can be started much more quickly following radiopharmaceutical injection (30–45 minutes, compared to 2–3 hours for MDP/HDP). [^{18}F]NaF PET is hampered by high demand for scanners, and limited tracer availability.
