= Octreotide scan =

Type of medical imaging

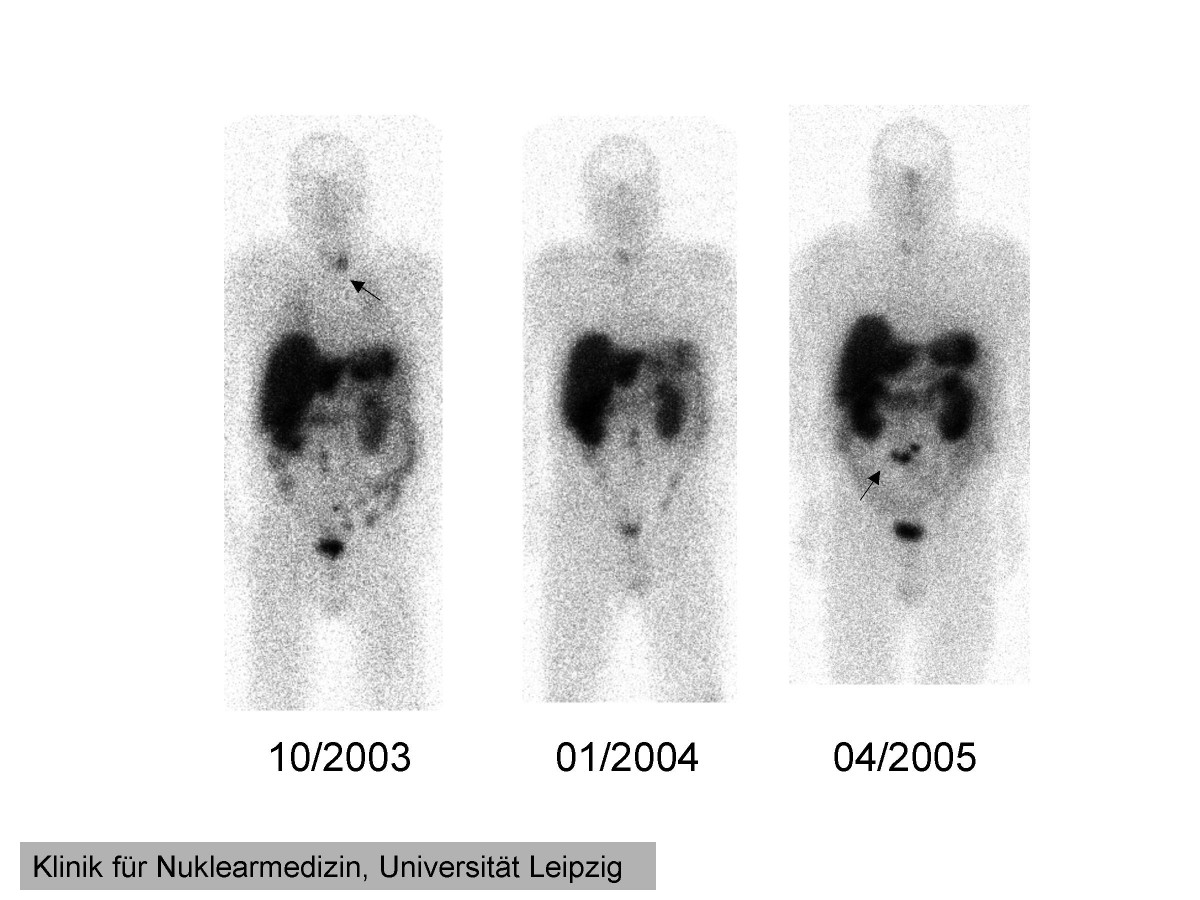
- 111In-pentetreotide scintigraphy of a 41-year-old man with ectopic Cushing's syndrome caused by a neuroendocrine carcinoma of the mesentery. Radiotracer accumulation in the left thyroid in 10/2003 (arrow). The mesenterial neuroendocrine tumor became clearly visible in 4/2005 (arrow).
- Synonyms: ocreoscan
- ICD-9-CM: 92.18
- OPS-301 code: 3-70c

An octreotide scan is a type of SPECT scintigraphy used to find carcinoid, pancreatic neuroendocrine tumors, and to localize sarcoidosis. It is also called somatostatin receptor scintigraphy (SRS). Octreotide, a drug similar to somatostatin, is radiolabeled with indium-111, and is injected into a vein and travels through the bloodstream. The radioactive octreotide attaches to tumor cells that have receptors for somatostatin (i.e. gastrinoma, glucagonoma, etc.). A gamma camera detects the radioactive octreotide, and makes pictures showing where the tumor cells are in the body, typically by a SPECT technique. A technetium-99m based radiopharmaceutical kit is also available.

Octreotide scanning is reported to have a sensitivity between 75% and 100% for detecting pancreatic neuroendocrine tumors.

Instead of gamma-emitting ^{111}In, certain octreotide derivatives such as edotreotide (DOTATOC) or DOTATATE are able to be linked by chelation to positron-emitting isotopes such as gallium-68 and copper-64 which in turn can be evaluated with more precise (compared with SPECT) scanning techniques such as PET-CT. Thus, the octreotide scan is now being replaced in most centers with gallium-68 DOTATATE and copper-64 DOTATATE scans. Somatostatin receptor imaging can now be performed with positron emission tomography (PET) which offers higher resolution and more rapid imaging.

== Indications ==
An octreotide scan may be used to locate suspected primary neuroendocrine tumours (NET) or for follow-up or staging after treatment.

Where indicated, octreotide scanning for NET tumors is being increasingly replaced by gallium-68 DOTA and copper-64 DOTATATE scans.

== Procedure ==
=== Indium-111 ===
Indium In-111 pentetreotide

Clinical data
- Trade names: Octreoscan
- Other names: MP-1727
- License data: US DailyMed: Indium_in-111_pentetreotide
- Routes of administration: Intravenous
- ATC code: V09IB01 (WHO)

Legal status
- Legal status: US: ℞-only

Identifiers
- CAS Number: 139096-04-1
- PubChem CID: 131704321
- DrugBank: DB11835
- UNII: M312JJ6Z32

Chemical and physical data
- 3D model (JSmol): Interactive image
- SMILES: [111In+3].CC(O)C(CO)N=C(O)C1CSSCC(N=C(O)C(CC2=CC=CC=C2)N=C([O-])CN(CCN(CCC(C(O)=O)C(O)=O)CC([O-])=O)CC([O-])=O)C(O)=NC(CC2=CC=CC=C2)C(O)=NC(CC2=CNC3=CC=CC=C23)C(O)=NC(CCCCN)C([O-])=NC(C(C)O)C(O)=N1
- InChI: InChI=1S/C62H84N12O19S2.In/c1-35(76)47(32-75)69-59(88)49-34-95-94-33-48(70-55(84)44(25-37-13-5-3-6-14-37)65-50(78)29-74(31-52(81)82)24-23-73(30-51(79)80)22-20-41(61(90)91)62(92)93)58(87)67-45(26-38-15-7-4-8-16-38)56(85)68-46(27-39-28-64-42-18-10-9-17-40(39)42)57(86)66-43(19-11-12-21-63)54(83)72-53(36(2)77)60(89)71-49;/h3-10,13-18,28,35-36,41,43-49,53,64,75-77H,11-12,19-27,29-34,63H2,1-2H3,(H,65,78)(H,66,86)(H,67,87)(H,68,85)(H,69,88)(H,70,84)(H,71,89)(H,72,83)(H,79,80)(H,81,82)(H,90,91)(H,92,93);/q;+3/p-4/i;1-4; Key:ZKZPXKKVDJOAIS-JWFOFJTQSA-J

The indium-111 pentetreotide radiopharmaceutical is prepared from a kit in a radiopharmacy. Pentetreotide is a DTPA conjugate of octreotide.

Approximately 200 megabecquerels (MBq) of indium-111 is injected intravenously. Imaging takes place 24 hours after injection, but may also be carried out at 4 and 48 hours.

=== Technetium-99m ===
The ^{99m}Tc product is supplied as a kit with two vials, one containing the chelating agent ethylenediaminediacetic acid (EDDA) and the other the HYNIC-Tyr3-octreotide chelator and somatostatin analog. Approximately 400-700 MBq may be administered, with imaging at 2, 4, and occasionally 24 hours post administration. ^{99m}Tc based octreotide imaging shows slightly higher sensitivity than ^{111}In.
