= Scintigraphy =

Diagnostic imaging test in nuclear medicine

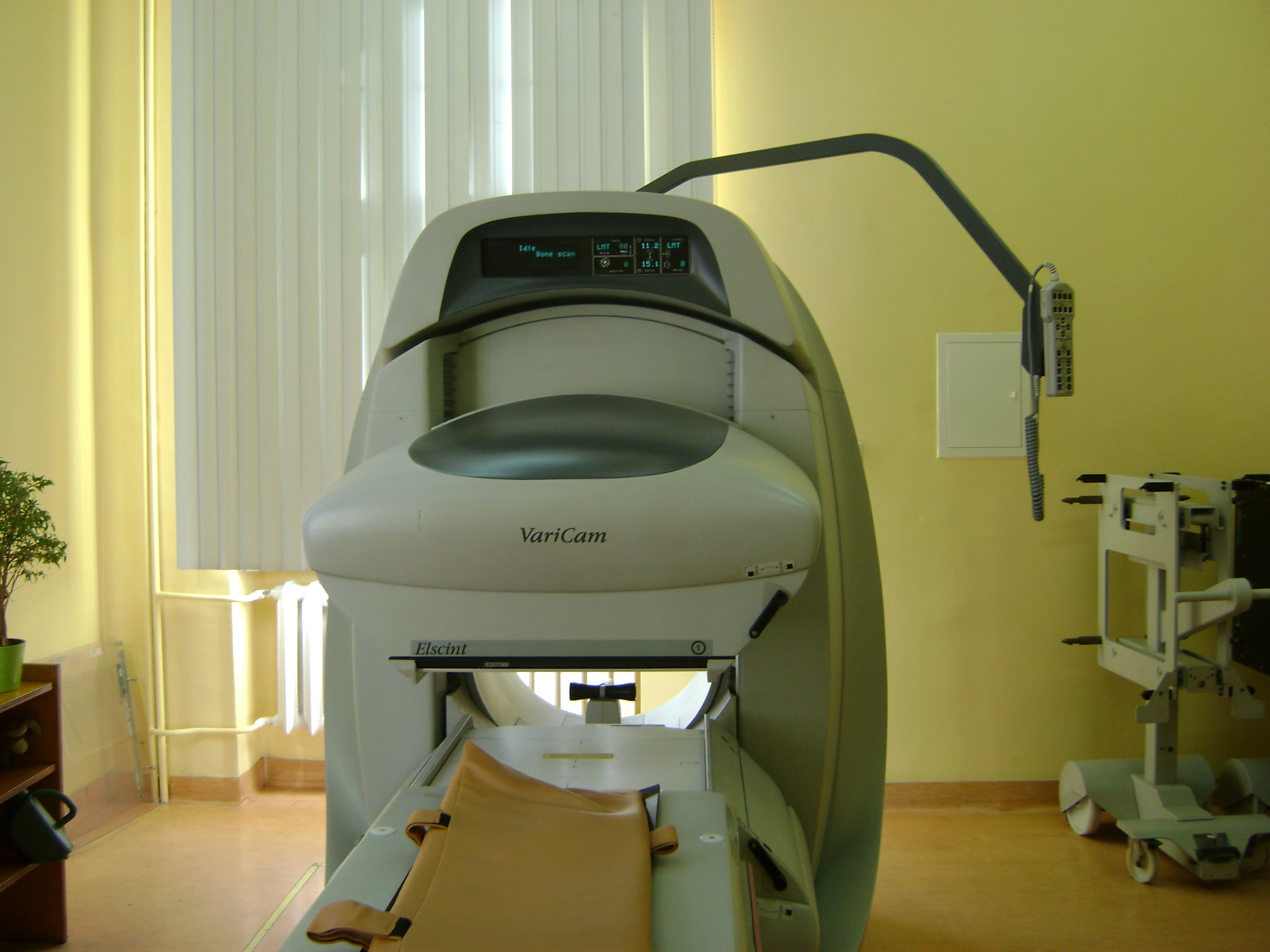
- Scintigraphy
- ICD-9-CM: 92.0-92.1
- MeSH: D011877
- OPS-301 code: 3-70

Scintigraphy (from Latin scintilla, "spark"), previously also known as scintillography, also known as a gamma scan, is a diagnostic test in nuclear medicine, in which a radiopharmaceutical (a radioisotope attached to a drug) is taken internally, travels to a specific organ or tissue, and emits gamma rays, which are then captured by a gamma camera, an external detector that forms two-dimensional images in a process similar to the capture of X-ray images. Scintigraphy is unlike a diagnostic X-ray where radiation from an external source passes through the body to form an image.

Single-photon emission computed tomography (SPECT) and positron emission tomography (PET) also collect 2-D images using gamma cameras, but they collect multiple 2-D images at multiple angles, from which they reconstruct 3-dimensional images, and are therefore classified as separate techniques from scintigraphy.

== Process ==
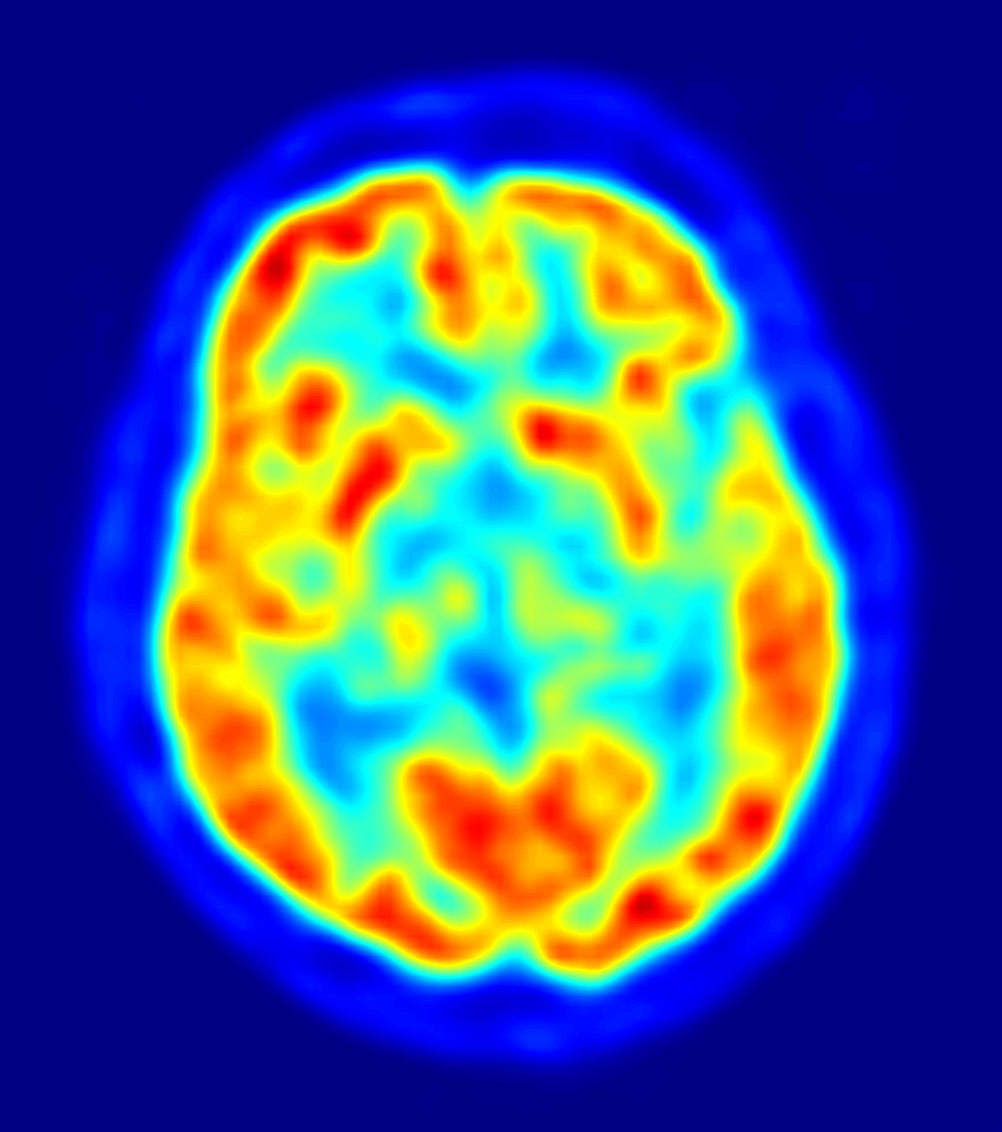
Computer representation of false-color image of a cross section of human brain, based on scintigraphy in positron emission tomography

Scintigraphy is an imaging method of nuclear reactions provoked by collisions or charged current interactions among nuclear particles or ionizing radiation and atoms which result in a brief, localised pulse of electromagnetic radiation, usually in the visible light range (Cherenkov radiation). This pulse (scintillation) is usually detected and amplified by a photomultiplier or charge-coupled device elements, and its resulting electrical waveform is processed by computers to provide two- and three-dimensional images of a subject or region of interest.

Schematic of a photomultiplier tube coupled to a scintillator.

Cross section of a gamma camera.

Scintigraphy is mainly used in scintillation cameras in experimental physics. For example, huge neutrino detection underground tanks filled with tetrachloroethylene are surrounded by arrays of photo detectors in order to capture the extremely rare event of a collision between the fluid's atoms and a neutrino.

Another extensive use of scintigraphy is in medical imaging techniques which use gamma ray detectors called gamma cameras. Detectors coated with materials which scintillate when subjected to gamma rays are scanned with optical photon detectors and scintillation counters. The subjects are injected with special radionuclides which irradiate in the gamma range inside the region of interest, such as the heart or the brain. A special type of gamma camera is the single-photon emission computed tomography (SPECT). Another medical scintigraphy technique, the positron emission tomography (PET), which uses the scintillations provoked by electron–positron annihilation phenomena.

== By organ or organ system ==
=== Biliary system (cholescintigraphy) ===
Scintigraphy of the biliary system is called cholescintigraphy and is done to diagnose obstruction of the bile ducts by a gallstone (cholelithiasis), a tumor, or another cause. It can also diagnose gallbladder diseases, e.g. bile leaks of biliary fistulas. In cholescintigraphy, the injected radioactive chemical is taken up by the liver and secreted into the bile. The radiopharmaceutical then goes into the bile ducts, the gallbladder, and the intestines. The gamma camera is placed on the abdomen to picture these perfused organs. Other scintigraphic tests are done similarly.

=== Lung scintigraphy ===
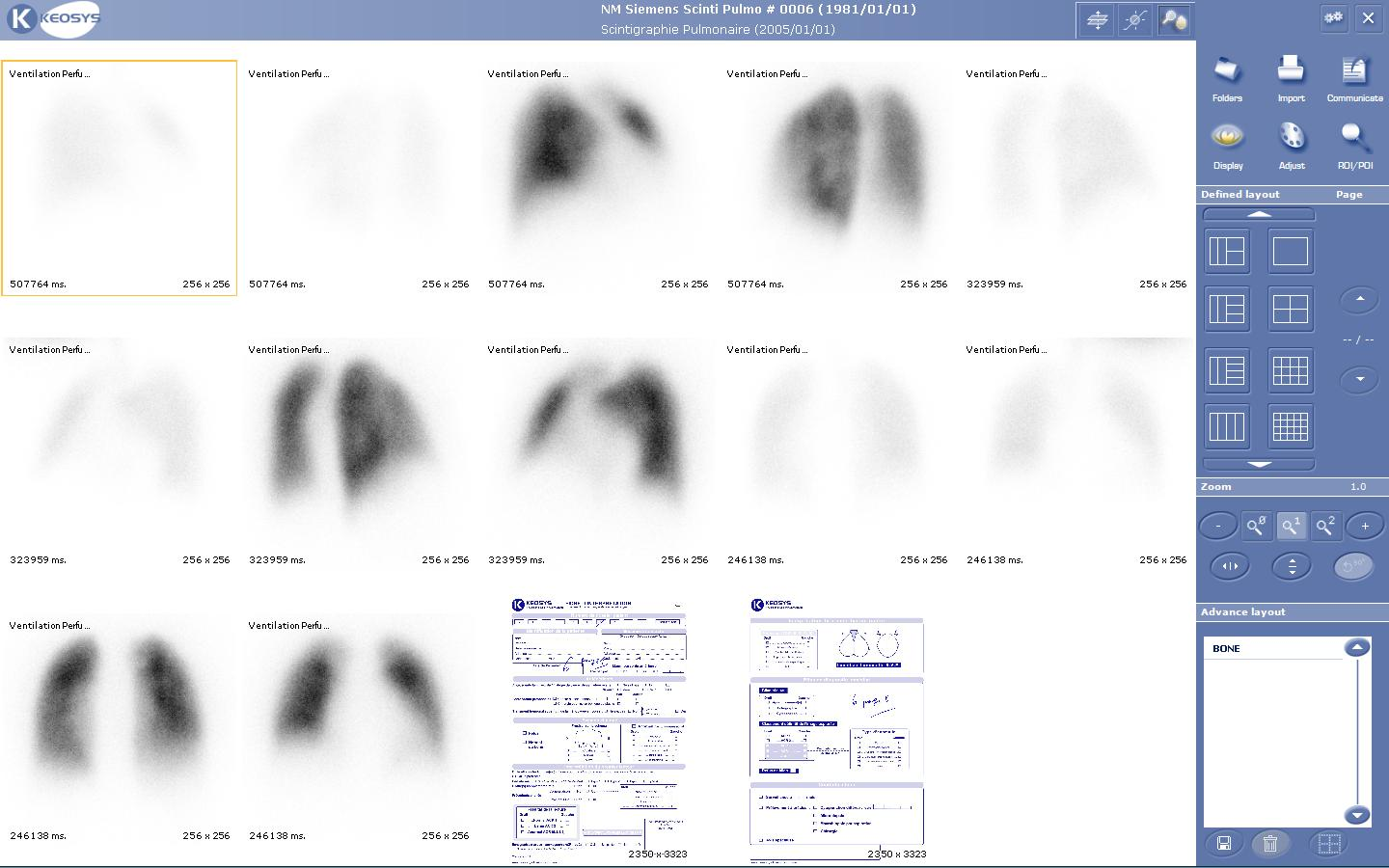
Lung scintigraphy evaluating lung cancer

The most common indication for lung scintigraphy is to diagnose pulmonary embolism, e.g. with a ventilation/perfusion scan and may be appropriate for excluding PE in pregnancy. Many centres now routinely use SPECT (single-photon emission computed tomography) rather than just planar imaging for V/Q scans; in a survey of Australia, Canada, France, Germany, and the United States, over 80 % of centres used SPECT for acute pulmonary embolism diagnosis, and in >70 % of those combined it with CT imaging. Less common indications include evaluation of lung transplantation, preoperative evaluation, evaluation of right-to-left shunts.

In the ventilation phase of a ventilation/perfusion scan, a gaseous radionuclide xenon or technetium DTPA in an aerosol form (or ideally using Technegas, a radioaerosol invented in Australia by Dr Bill Burch and Dr Richard Fawdry) is inhaled by the patient through a mouthpiece or mask that covers the nose and mouth. The perfusion phase of the test involves the intravenous injection of radioactive technetium (^{99m}Tc) albumin aggregated. A gamma camera acquires the images for both phases of the study.

=== Bone ===
For example, the ligand methylene diphosphonate (MDP) can be preferentially taken up by bone. By chemically attaching technetium-99m to MDP, forming technetium (^{99m}Tc) medronic acid, radioactivity can be transported and attached to bone via the hydroxyapatite for imaging. Any increased physiological function, such as a fracture in the bone, will usually mean increased concentration of the tracer.

=== Heart ===
A nuclear stress test is a form of scintigraphy, where the amount of thallium-201 detected in cardiac tissues correlates with tissue blood supply. Viable cardiac cells have normal Na^{+}/K^{+} ion exchange pumps. Thallium binds the K^{+} pumps and is transported into the cells. Exercise or dipyridamole induces widening (vasodilation) of normal coronary arteries. This produces coronary steal from areas of ischemia where arteries are already maximally dilated. Areas of infarct or ischemic tissue will remain "cold". Pre- and post-stress thallium may indicate areas that will benefit from myocardial revascularization. Redistribution indicates the existence of coronary steal and the presence of ischemic coronary artery disease.

Technetium (^{99m}Tc) sestamibi is also used.

=== Parathyroid ===
Technetium (^{99m}Tc) sestamibi is used to detect parathyroid adenomas.

=== Thyroid ===
To detect metastases/function of thyroid, the isotopes technetium-99m or iodine-123 are generally used, and for this purpose the iodide isotope does not need to be attached to another protein or molecule, because thyroid tissue takes up free iodide actively.

=== Full body ===
Examples are gallium scans, indium white blood cell scans, iobenguane scan (MIBG), and octreotide scans. The MIBG scan detects adrenergic tissue and thus can be used to identify the location of tumors such as pheochromocytomas and neuroblastomas.

== Function tests ==
Certain tests, such as the Schilling test and urea breath test, use radioisotopes but are not used to produce a specific image.

== History ==
Scintigraphic scanning was invented and proven by Neurologist and Radiologist professor Bernard George Ziedses des Plantes. He presented the results in 1950 under the name "indirect autoradiograph". In 1970, the Physikalisch-Medizinische Gesellschaft für Neuroradiologie (The Physics and Medical Society for Neuroradiology) instituted the 'Ziedses des Plantes Medal'. It was first awarded to W. Oldendorf and G. Hounsfield in 1974 for Computer Tomography (CT). Later, in 1985, the medal was awarded to Ziedses des Plantes himself. In 1977 he received The Roentgen Medal.

== See also ==
- Gamma camera
- Medical imaging
- Nuclear medicine
