= SSR2 =

Protein-coding gene in humans

Identifiers
- Aliases: SSR2, TLAP, TRAP-BETA, TRAPB, HSD25, signal sequence receptor subunit 2
- External IDs: OMIM: 600867; MGI: 1913506; GeneCards: SSR2

Gene location (Human)
| Chr. | Chromosome 1 (human) |
| Band | 1q22 | Start | 156,009,048 bp |
| Band | 1q22 | End | 156,020,951 bp |

Gene location (Mouse)
| Chr. | Chromosome 3 (mouse) |
| Band | 3|3 F1 | Start | 88,575,876 bp |
| Band | 3|3 F1 | End | 88,588,419 bp |
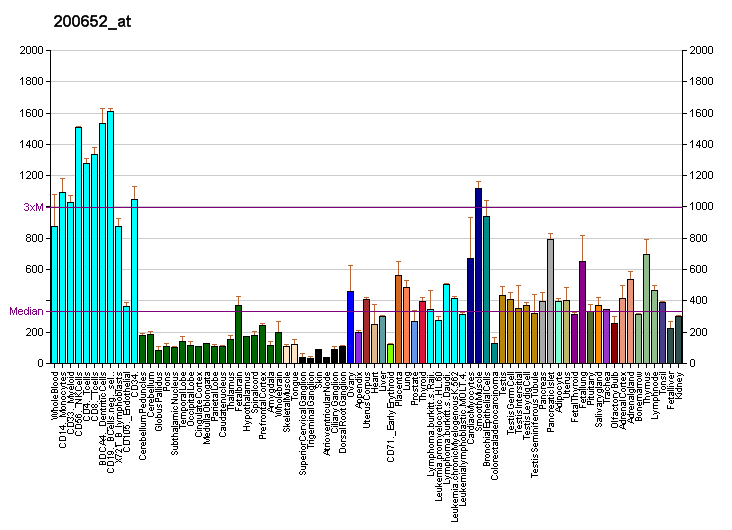
RNA expression pattern
| Bgee | Human / Mouse (ortholog); Top expressed in: body of pancreas; islet of Langerhans; stromal cell of endometrium; ganglionic eminence; canal of the cervix; left adrenal gland; left ovary; granulocyte; left adrenal cortex; right adrenal gland / Top expressed in: yolk sac; tail of embryo; genital tubercle; seminal vesicula; lip; molar; islet of Langerhans; embryo; spermatocyte; efferent ductule; More reference expression data |
| BioGPS | More reference expression data |
Gene ontology
| Molecular function | protein binding |
| Cellular component | integral component of membrane; endoplasmic reticulum membrane; endoplasmic reticulum; membrane |
| Biological process | cotranslational protein targeting to membrane |
Sources:Amigo / QuickGO
Orthologs
| Databases | NCBI: entry; OMA: entry |
| Species | Human | Mouse |
| Entrez | 6746 | 66256 |
| Ensembl | ENSG00000163479 | ENSMUSG00000041355 |
| UniProt | P43308 | Q9CPW5 |
| RefSeq (mRNA) | NM_003145 | NM_025448 |
| RefSeq (protein) | NP_003136 | NP_079724; NP_001343245; NP_001343246; NP_001343247; NP_001343248 |
| Location (UCSC) | Chr 1: 156.01 – 156.02 Mb | Chr 3: 88.58 – 88.59 Mb |
| PubMed search |
- Wikidata
| View/Edit Human | View/Edit Mouse |

Translocon-associated protein subunit beta also known as TRAP-beta is a protein that in humans is encoded by the SSR2 gene.

== Function ==
The signal sequence receptor (SSR) is a glycosylated endoplasmic reticulum (ER) membrane receptor associated with protein translocation across the ER membrane. The SSR consists of 2 subunits, a 34-kD glycoprotein (alpha-SSR or SSR1) and a 22-kD glycoprotein (beta-SSR or SSR2). The human beta-signal sequence receptor gene (SSR2) maps to chromosome bands 1q21-q23.
