= Indium (111In) satumomab pendetide =

Monoclonal antibody

Indium (^{111}In) satumomab pendetide
Monoclonal antibody
- Type: Whole antibody
- Source: Mouse
- Target: TAG-72

Clinical data
- Other names: MAb B72.3-GYK-DTPA
- ATC code: V09IB02 (WHO)

Identifiers
- CAS Number: 138955-27-8 144058-40-2
- ChemSpider: none
- UNII: 7V9926378A

Indium (^{111}In) satumomab pendetide (trade name OncoScint CR103) is a mouse monoclonal antibody which is used for cancer diagnosis. The antibody, satumomab, is linked to pendetide, a derivative of DTPA. Pendetide acts as a chelating agent for the radionuclide indium-111.
