= Tumor-associated glycoprotein 72 =

Tumor-associated glycoprotein 72 (TAG-72) is a glycoprotein that appears on the surface of many cancer cells, including those from the ovary, breast, colon, lung, and pancreatic cancers. TAG-72 is a mucin-like molecule with a molar mass of over 1000 kDa, and is classified as a tumor-associated glycoprotein.

== Discovery ==
Researchers identified tumor-associated glycoprotein 72 (TAG-72) in the mid-1980s during the development of the Monoclonal antibody B72.3. These antibodies selectively bound to a high-molecular-weight glycoprotein found on various Carcinoma cells. Later studies confirmed TAG-72 as a Mucin-like molecule with significant Glycosylation, which adds to its high molecular weight. This discovery has supported advancements in cancer diagnostics and therapeutics, especially those targeting TAG-72-expressing tumors.

== Structure ==
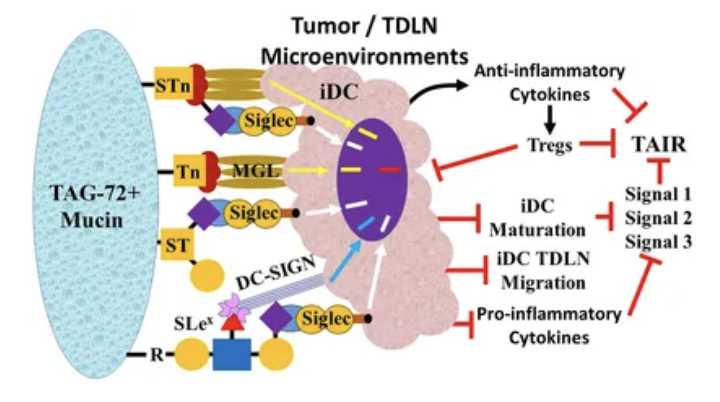

TAG-72 is a high-molecular-weight glycoprotein (>1,000 Kda), primarily expressed on the surface of various adenocarcinomas. Its structure is features extensive O-linked glycosylation, which gives it a mucin-like configuration. The glycosylation patterns of TAG-72 include tumor-associated carbohydrate antigens such as sialyl-Tn (STn) and Thomsen–Friedenreich antigens, which are contribute to tumor progression and metastasis. These carbohydrate epitopes serve as binding sites for monoclonal antibodies like B72.3 and CC49, enabling targeted cancer detection and treatment.

== Pathogenic mechanism ==
TAG-72 rarely appears in normal adult tissues but is highly present in malignant epithelial cells, which makes it a tumor specific antigen. It plays a role in:

- Tumor progression: TAG-72 forms part of the mucinous barrier that shields tumor cells from immune recognition.
- Cell adhesion and metastasis: glycosylation of TAG-72 influences how tumor cells interact with the extracellular matrix, facilitating metastasis.

== Clinical applications ==
=== Tumor marker (CA 72-4 assay) ===
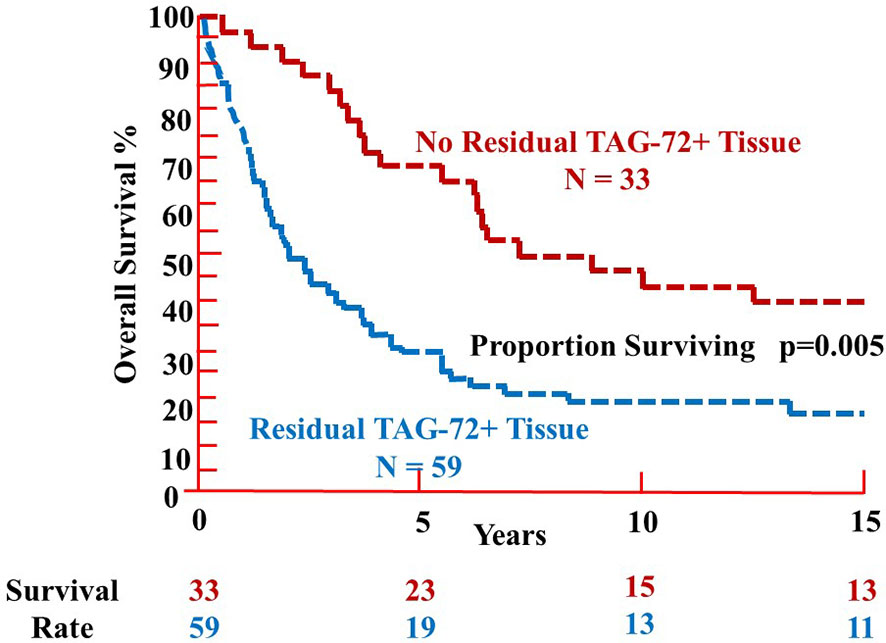
There was a significant difference (p = 0.005) in the proportion surviving between those patients with no residual TAG-72-positive tissue at the end of surgery (red dashed line) as compared to those patients where residual TAG-72-positive tissue (blue dashed line) remained at the end of surgery.

TAG-72 is commonly measured with radioimmunoassays such as CA 72-4, which uses the monoclonal antibodies indium (111In) satumomab pendetide and iodine (125I) minretumomab. This assay has a good specificity for gastric cancer, with a correlation to the neoplasia's extension. It is used for:

=== Cancer diagnosis and staging ===
- Monitoring recurrence and therapy effectiveness
- Targeted cancer therapies

=== Monoclonal antibody therapy ===
Since TAG-72 is tumor-specific, it is a promising target for immunotherapy and antibody-drug conjugates:

- Minretumomab (CC49) has been studied for targeting TAG-72 in solid tumors.
- Anatumomab mafenatox is an anti-TAG-72 antibody conjugated with toxins for cancer treatment.

=== CAR T cell therapy ===
CAR T cells engineered to recognize TAG-72 have been tested in ovarian and colorectal cancer.

== Cancer association ==
TAG-72 is mainly found in epithelial-derived malignancies, including:

=== Gastrointestinal ===
- Colorectal cancer: TAG-72 is overexpressed in colorectal adenocarcinoma, and serum levels often reflect tumor stage and prognosis
- Gastric cancer: CA 72-4, an immunoassay detecting TAG-72, is widely used for diagnosing and monitoring gastric cancer.
- Pancreatic cancer: TAG-72 levels have helped in diagnosing late stage pancreatic cancers.

=== Gynecological ===
- Ovarian cancer: TAG-72 expression correlates with tumor stage and patient prognosis.

=== Other cancers ===
- Lung cancer: TAG-72 is present in a subset of non-small cell lung carcinomas.
- Breast cancer: Although less specific, TAG-72 has been detected in certain aggressive breast cancer subtypes.
