= Tumor-associated glycoprotein =

Tumor marker and glycoprotein

Tumor-associated glycoproteins (TAGs) are glycoproteins found on the surface of many cancer cells. They are mucin-like molecules with a molar mass of over 1000 kDa.

== See also ==
- Tumor-associated glycoprotein 72
