= Minretumomab =

Monoclonal antibody

Monoclonal antibody
- Type: Whole antibody
- Source: Mouse
- Target: TAG-72

Clinical data
- Other names: CC49
- ATC code: V09IX03 (WHO) (^{125}I radiolabelled)

Identifiers
- CAS Number: 195189-17-4
- ChemSpider: none
- UNII: 235435CH6L

Minretumomab (CC49) is a mouse monoclonal antibody that was designed for the treatment of cancers that express the TAG-72 antigen. This includes breast, colon, lung, and pancreatic cancers. Apparently, it never got past Phase I clinical trials for this purpose.

== Derivatives ==
A wide range of derivatives has been used in pharmaceutical research. Examples include chimeric and humanized minretumomab, as well as a fusion protein of a minretumomab single-chain variable fragment and the enzyme beta-lactamase.

=== Radiopharmaceuticals ===
Iodine (^{125}I) minretumomab is an iodine-125 radiolabelled derivative that was developed for the detection of tumours in radioimmunoassays such as CA 72-4.

Radiolabelled minretumomab has also been tested for the treatment of solid tumours, but without success. Iodine (^{131}I) and lutetium (^{177}Lu) minretumomab, for example, were shown to induce human anti-mouse antibodies; no tumour response was observed in Phase I and II clinical trials.
