= Rectilinear scanner =

Obsolete radiopharmaceutical imaging device

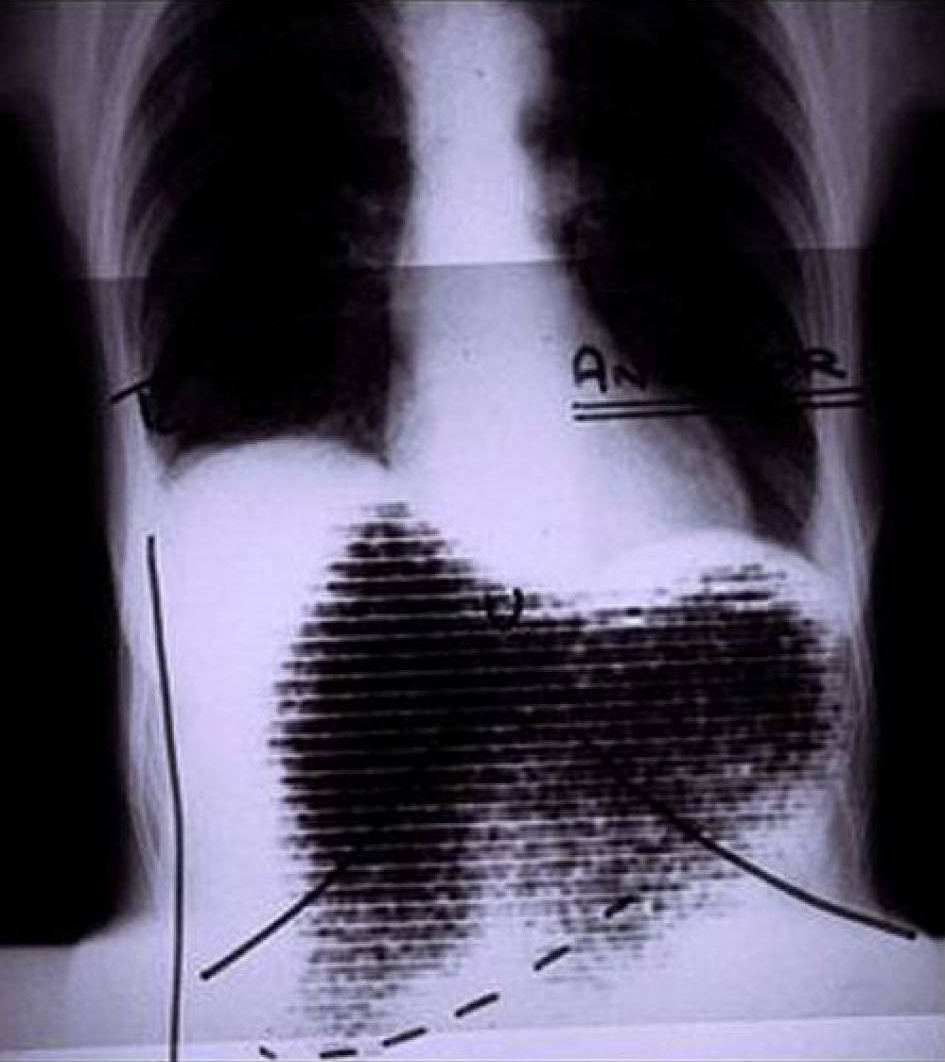
- Manual image fusion of x-rayed and rectilinear scanned chest
- Purpose: capture emission from radiopharmaceuticals in nuclear medicine.

A rectilinear scanner is an imaging device, used to capture emission from radiopharmaceuticals in nuclear medicine. The image is created by physically moving a radiation detector over the surface of a radioactive patient. It has become obsolete in medical imaging, largely replaced by the gamma camera since the late 1960s.

== History ==
One of the first rectilinear scanners was developed by Benedict Cassen in 1950. Before then hand-held detectors had been used to locate radioactive materials in patients, but the Cassen system (designed for Iodine-131) combined a motor driven photomultiplier tube and printing mechanism. Subsequent developments improved the detection systems, movement, display and printing of images.

== Components ==
Schematic of a basic rectilinear scanning system

Cassen's original rectilinear scanner used calcium tungstate (CaWo_{4}) crystal as the radiation detector. Later systems used a Sodium iodide (NaI) scintillator, as in a gamma camera. The detector must be connected by mechanical or electronic means to an output system. This could be a simple light source over photographic film, dot matrix printer, oscilloscope or television screen.

== Mechanism ==
The patient is administered with a radioactive pharmaceutical agent, such as radio-iodine which will naturally collect in the thyroid. The detector moves in a raster pattern over studied area of the patient, making a constant count rate. A collimator restricts detection to a small area directly below its position so that by the end of the scan emission from the whole study area has been detected. The output method is designed such that positional and detection information is maintained. For example, when using a light source and film the light is moved in tandem with the detector, and the intensity of light produced increases with an increase in activity, producing dark areas on the film.

Disadvantages include the very long imaging time (several minutes) due to the need to separately cover each target area, unlike a gamma camera which has a much larger field of view, and the motion artefacts this can result in.
