= Pendetide =

Names
- IUPAC name N^{6}-[N-[2-[[2-[Bis(carboxymethyl)amino]ethyl](carboxymethyl)amino]ethyl]-N-(carboxymethyl)glycyl]-N^{2}-(N-glycyl-L-tyrosyl)-L-lysine

Identifiers
CAS Number	148805-91-8
3D model (JSmol)	Interactive image
ChemSpider	16737038
PubChem CID	66648912
UNII	60C8D1C9UJ
CompTox Dashboard (EPA)	DTXSID60164112
- InChI: InChI=1S/C31H47N7O14/c32-14-24(40)34-23(13-20-4-6-21(39)7-5-20)30(50)35-22(31(51)52)3-1-2-8-33-25(41)15-37(17-27(44)45)11-9-36(16-26(42)43)10-12-38(18-28(46)47)19-29(48)49/h4-7,22-23,39H,1-3,8-19,32H2,(H,33,41)(H,34,40)(H,35,50)(H,42,43)(H,44,45)(H,46,47)(H,48,49)(H,51,52)/t22-,23-/m0/s1 Key: ZMEWRPBAQVSBBB-GOTSBHOMSA-N; InChI=1/C31H47N7O14/c32-14-24(40)34-23(13-20-4-6-21(39)7-5-20)30(50)35-22(31(51)52)3-1-2-8-33-25(41)15-37(17-27(44)45)11-9-36(16-26(42)43)10-12-38(18-28(46)47)19-29(48)49/h4-7,22-23,39H,1-3,8-19,32H2,(H,33,41)(H,34,40)(H,35,50)(H,42,43)(H,44,45)(H,46,47)(H,48,49)(H,51,52)/t22-,23-/m0/s1 Key: ZMEWRPBAQVSBBB-GOTSBHOMBD
- SMILES: c1cc(ccc1CC(C(=O)NC(CCCCNC(=O)CN(CCN(CCN(CC(=O)O)CC(=O)O)CC(=O)O)CC(=O)O)C(=O)O)NC(=O)CN)O

Properties
Chemical formula	C_{31}H_{47}N_{7}O_{14}
Molar mass	741.318 g/mol
- Except where otherwise noted, data are given for materials in their standard state (at 25 °C [77 °F], 100 kPa). verify (what is ?) Infobox references

Pendetide (GYK-DTPA) is a chelating agent. It consists of pentetic acid (DTPA) linked to the tripeptide glycine (G) – L-tyrosine (Y) – L-lysine (K).

== Use ==
The following monoclonal antibodies are linked to pendetide to chelate a radionuclide, indium-111. The antibodies selectively bind to certain tumour cells, and the radioactivity is then used for imaging of the tumours.

- Indium (^{111}In) capromab pendetide (prostate cancer)
- Indium (^{111}In) satumomab pendetide (other cancer types)
