= Anatumomab mafenatox =

Chemical compound

Monoclonal antibody
- Type: Fab fragment
- Source: Mouse
- Target: TAG-72

Clinical data
- ATC code: none

Identifiers
- CAS Number: 1370261-50-9
- ChemSpider: none
- UNII: 7E628D4GSQ

Anatumomab mafenatox is a mouse monoclonal antibody studied for the treatment non-small cell lung cancer, which acts as a tumor-targeted superantigen.

It is a fusion protein of a human tumor-associated 5T4 antigen monoclonal IgG1 Fab fragment with an enterotoxin ('mafenatox') of Staphylococcus aureus.

Development was abandoned in 2005.
