= Indium-111 =

Isotope of indium

General
- Symbol: ^{111}In
- Names: indium-111
- Protons (Z): 49
- Neutrons (N): 62

Nuclide data
- Natural abundance: syn
- Half-life (t_{1/2}): 2.8048 d
- Decay products: ^{111}Cd

Decay modes
- Decay mode: Decay energy (MeV)
- EC: 0.862

Indium-111 (^{111}In) is a radioactive isotope of indium (In). It decays by electron capture to stable cadmium-111 with a half-life of 2.8048 days. The isotope is produced by proton irradiation of a cadmium target (^{112}Cd(p,2n) or ^{111}Cd(p,n)) in a cyclotron, as recommended by International Atomic Energy Agency (IAEA). The former method is more commonly used as it results in a higher level of radionuclide purity.

Indium-111 is commonly used in nuclear medicine diagnostic imaging by radiolabeling targeted molecules or cells. During its radioactive decay, it emits gamma (γ) photons which can be imaged using planar or single-photon emission computed tomography (SPECT) gamma cameras (primary energies: 171.3 keV (91%) and 245.4 keV (94%)).

== Uses in nuclear medicine ==
When formulated as an ^{111}InCl_{3} solution, it can be used to bind antibodies, peptides, or other molecular targeted proteins or other molecules, typically using a chelate to bind the radionuclide (in this case ^{111}In) to the targeting molecule during the radiosynthesis/ radiolabeling process, which is tailored to the desired product.

=== ^{111}In labeled antibodies ===
- Ibritumomab Tiuxetan; Zevalin - For dosimetry estimates prior to ^{90}Y immunotherapy for lymphoma
- ^{111}In ProstaScint — PSMA antibody imaging of prostate cancer

=== ^{111}In labeled peptides ===
- ^{111}In pentetreotide (including in ^{111}In (diethylenetriaminopentaacetic (DTPA)-octreotide) and Octreoscan)
  - Octreotide is an somatostatin receptor inhibitor pharmaceutical which binds with high affinity to somatostatin receptors 2 and 5, interfering with normal receptor function. It is used as a drug to treat several neuroendocrine tumors in which somatostatin receptors are overexpressed or overactive. Examples include:
    - Sympathoadrenal system tumors: pheochromocytoma, neuroblastoma, ganglioneuroma, paraganglioma
    - Gastroenteropancreatic (GEP) tumors: carcinoid, insulinoma
    - Medullary thyroid cancer, pituitary adenoma, small cell lung cancer
  - ^{111}In pentetreotide imaging can identify the presence, levels of somatostatin receptor 2,5 expression, extent of disease and response to therapy
- ^{111}In can also be formulated in the chemical form ^{111}In oxyquinoline (oxine) for labeling blood cells and components
- Platelets for thrombus detection
- Leukocytes for localization of inflammation and abscesses, detect and monitor osteomyelitis, and detect mycotic aneurysms, vascular graft and shunt infections and determination of leukocyte kinetics;

== See also ==
- Isotopes of indium
- Indium white blood cell scan
