= Copper (64Cu) oxodotreotide =

Radioactive diagnostic agent used in PET scan to localize tumors

Copper (^{64}Cu) oxodotreotide

Clinical data
- Trade names: Detectnet
- AHFS/Drugs.com: Micromedex Detailed Consumer Information
- License data: US DailyMed: Detectnet
- Routes of administration: Intravenous
- ATC code: V09IX15 (WHO)

Legal status
- Legal status: US: ℞-only

Identifiers
- IUPAC name: 2-[4-[2-[[(2R)-1-[[(4R,7S,10S,13R,16S,19R)-10-(4-aminobutyl)-4-[[(1S,2R)-1-carboxy-2-hydroxypropyl]carbamoyl]-7-[(1R)-1-hydroxyethyl]-16-[(4-hydroxyphenyl)methyl]-13-(1H-indol-3-ylmethyl)-6,9,12,15,18-pentaoxo-1,2-dithia-5,8,11,14,17-pentazacycloicos-19-yl]amino]-1-oxo-3-phenylpropan-2-yl]amino]-2-oxoethyl]-10-(carboxylatomethyl)-7-(carboxymethyl)-1,4,7,10-tetrazacyclododec-1-yl]acetate;copper-64(2+)
- CAS Number: 1426155-87-4
- PubChem CID: 124220636
- DrugBank: DB15873
- ChemSpider: 64854536
- UNII: N3858377KC
- KEGG: D11882
- CompTox Dashboard (EPA): DTXSID901336538

Chemical and physical data
- Formula: C_{65}H_{88}CuN_{14}O_{19}S_{2}
- Molar mass: 1497.16 g·mol^{−1}
- 3D model (JSmol): Interactive image
- SMILES: CC(C1C(=O)NC(CSSCC(C(=O)NC(C(=O)NC(C(=O)NC(C(=O)N1)CCCCN)CC2=CNC3=CC=CC=C32)CC4=CC=C(C=C4)O)NC(=O)C(CC5=CC=CC=C5)NC(=O)CN6CCN(CCN(CCN(CC6)CC(=O)[O-])CC(=O)[O-])CC(=O)O)C(=O)NC(C(C)O)C(=O)O)O.[Cu+2]
- InChI: InChI=1S/C65H90N14O19S2.Cu/c1-38(80)56-64(96)73-51(63(95)75-57(39(2)81)65(97)98)37-100-99-36-50(72-59(91)47(28-40-10-4-3-5-11-40)68-52(83)32-76-20-22-77(33-53(84)85)24-26-79(35-55(88)89)27-25-78(23-21-76)34-54(86)87)62(94)70-48(29-41-15-17-43(82)18-16-41)60(92)71-49(30-42-31-67-45-13-7-6-12-44(42)45)61(93)69-46(58(90)74-56)14-8-9-19-66;/h3-7,10-13,15-18,31,38-39,46-51,56-57,67,80-82H,8-9,14,19-30,32-37,66H2,1-2H3,(H,68,83)(H,69,93)(H,70,94)(H,71,92)(H,72,91)(H,73,96)(H,74,90)(H,75,95)(H,84,85)(H,86,87)(H,88,89)(H,97,98);/q;+2/p-2/t38-,39-,46+,47-,48+,49-,50+,51+,56+,57+;/m1./s1/i;1+0; Key:IJRLLVFQGCCPPI-NVGRTJHCSA-L

Copper (^{64}Cu) oxodotreotide or Copper Cu 64 dotatate, sold under the brand name Detectnet, is a radioactive diagnostic agent used with positron emission tomography (PET) for localization of somatostatin receptor positive neuroendocrine tumors in adults.

Common side effects include nausea, vomiting and flushing.

It was approved for medical use in the United States in September 2020.

== Medical uses ==
Copper (^{64}Cu) oxodotreotide is indicated for use with positron emission tomography (PET) for localization of somatostatin receptor positive neuroendocrine tumors in adults.

== History ==
The US Food and Drug Administration approved copper ^{64}Cu dotatate based on data from two trials that evaluated 175 adults.

Trial 1 evaluated adults, some of whom had known or suspected neuroendocrine tumors and some of whom were healthy volunteers. The trial was conducted at one site in the United States (Houston, TX). Both groups received copper ^{64}Cu dotatate and underwent PET scan imaging.

Trial 2 data came from the literature-reported trial of 112 adults, all of whom had history of neuroendocrine tumors and underwent PET scan imaging with copper ^{64}Cu dotatate. The trial was conducted at one site in Denmark. In both trials, copper ^{64}Cu dotatate images were compared to either biopsy results or other images taken by different techniques to detect the sites of a tumor. The images were read as either positive or negative for presence of neuroendocrine tumors by three independent image readers who did not know participant clinical information.

== Society and culture ==
=== Legal status ===
In May 2026, the European Medicines Agency recommended the refusal of the marketing authorization for Deqtynet, a diagnostic medicine intended for use with positron emission tomography (PET) imaging to detect well-differentiated neuroendocrine tumors in adults. The agency concluded that the medicine cannot be granted marketing authorization in the European Union because of the ten-year market exclusivity that had been granted for SomaKit TOC (edotreotide), which was authorized in December 2016, for a comparable condition.
