= Indium (111In) capromab pendetide =

Indium (^{111}In) capromab pendetide
Monoclonal antibody
- Type: Whole antibody
- Source: Mouse
- Target: Glutamate carboxypeptidase II

Clinical data
- Trade names: Prostascint
- ATC code: V09IB04 (WHO)

Identifiers
- CAS Number: 151763-64-3 (capromab) 148805-91-8 (pendetide)
- ChemSpider: none
- UNII: 03MZ53X1YS
- ChEMBL: ChEMBL1201579

Indium (^{111}In) capromab pendetide (trade name Prostascint) is used to image the extent of prostate cancer. Capromab is a mouse monoclonal antibody which recognizes a protein found on both prostate cancer cells and normal prostate tissue. It is linked to pendetide, a derivative of DTPA. Pendetide acts as a chelating agent for the radionuclide indium-111. Following an intravenous injection of Prostascint, imaging is performed using single-photon emission computed tomography (SPECT).

Early trials with yttrium (^{90}Y) capromab pendetide were also conducted.
