= SSR1 =

Protein-coding gene in the species Homo sapiens

Identifiers
- Aliases: SSR1, TRAPA, signal sequence receptor subunit 1
- External IDs: OMIM: 600868; MGI: 105082; GeneCards: SSR1

Gene location (Human)
Chr.	Chromosome 6 (human)
Band	6p24.3	Start	7,268,306 bp
Band	6p24.3	End	7,347,446 bp

Gene location (Mouse)
Chr.	Chromosome 13 (mouse)
Band	13|13 A3.3	Start	38,150,581 bp
Band	13|13 A3.3	End	38,178,193 bp
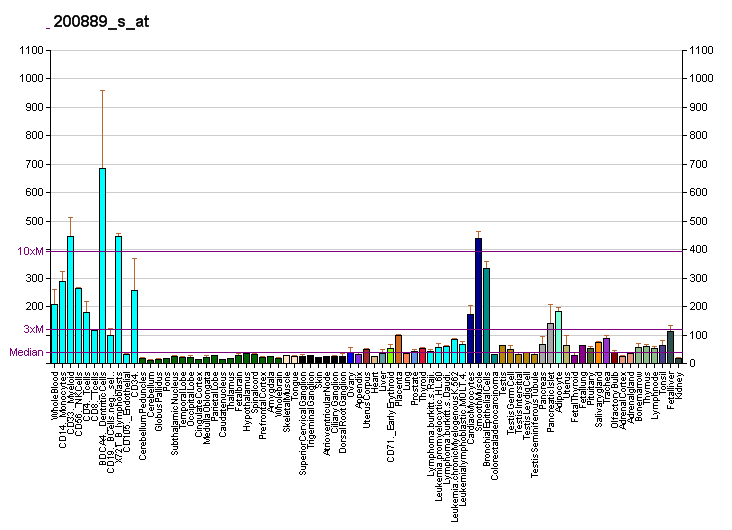

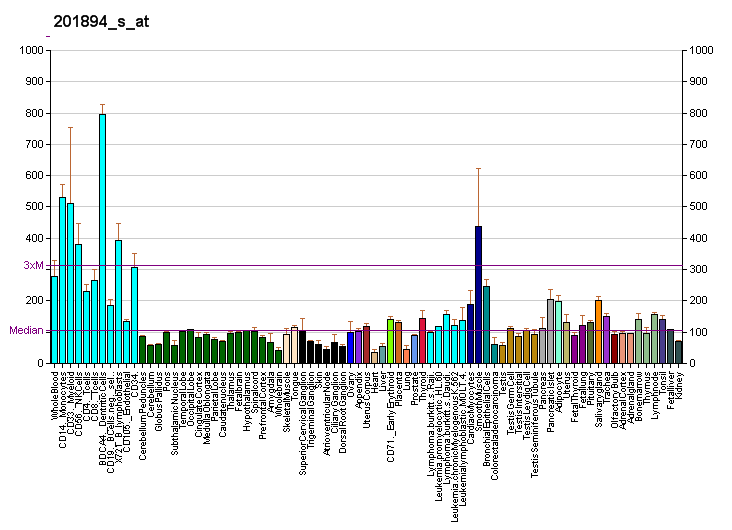

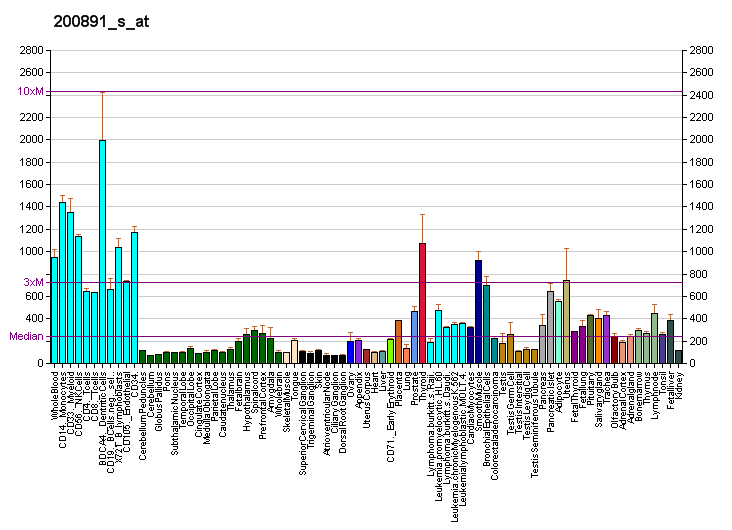
RNA expression pattern
Bgee	Human / Mouse (ortholog); Top expressed in: corpus epididymis; caput epididymis; trabecular bone; parotid gland; tibia; skin of hip; tail of epididymis; mucosa of sigmoid colon; germinal epithelium; gums / Top expressed in: calvaria; molar; cumulus cell; lacrimal gland; dermis; gastrula; abdominal wall; condyle; efferent ductule; fossa; More reference expression data
BioGPS	More reference expression data
Gene ontology
Molecular function	protein binding
Cellular component	integral component of membrane; endoplasmic reticulum membrane; membrane; endoplasmic reticulum
Biological process	IRE1-mediated unfolded protein response; cotranslational protein targeting to membrane; positive regulation of cell population proliferation
Sources:Amigo / QuickGO
Orthologs
Databases	NCBI: entry; OMA: entry
Species	Human	Mouse
Entrez	6745	107513
Ensembl	ENSG00000124783	ENSMUSG00000021427
UniProt	P43307	Q9CY50
RefSeq (mRNA)	NM_001292008; NM_003144	NM_025965; NM_001360842
RefSeq (protein)	NP_001278937; NP_003135	NP_080241; NP_001347771
Location (UCSC)	Chr 6: 7.27 – 7.35 Mb	Chr 13: 38.15 – 38.18 Mb
PubMed search
- Wikidata
View/Edit Human	View/Edit Mouse

Translocon-associated protein subunit alpha is a protein that in humans is encoded by the SSR1 gene.

The signal sequence receptor (SSR) is a glycosylated endoplasmic reticulum (ER) membrane receptor associated with protein translocation across the ER membrane. The SSR consists of 2 subunits, a 34-kD glycoprotein encoded by this gene and a 22-kD glycoprotein. This gene generates several mRNA species as a result of complex alternative polyadenylation. This gene is unusual in that it utilizes arrays of polyA signal sequences that are exclusively non-canonical.
