= Technetium (99mTc) medronic acid =

Chemical compound

Technetium (^{99m}Tc) medronic acid

Clinical data
- Trade names: Mdp-Bracco
- License data: US DailyMed: Medronate
- Routes of administration: Intravenous
- ATC code: V09BA02 (WHO)

Legal status
- Legal status: US: ℞-only

Identifiers
- IUPAC name: Methylenebis(phosphonic acid) technetium (^{99m}Tc)
- CAS Number: 121524-79-6
- PubChem CID: 157443
- DrugBank: DB09138
- ChemSpider: 34995234
- UNII: X89XV46R07
- KEGG: D02029
- ChEBI: CHEBI:32186
- ChEMBL: ChEMBL2110576
- CompTox Dashboard (EPA): DTXSID80230782

Chemical and physical data
- Formula: CH_{6}O_{6}P_{2} • x^{99m}Tc
- Molar mass: unknown

Technetium (^{99m}Tc) medronic acid is a pharmaceutical product used in nuclear medicine to localize bone metastases as well as other diseases that can alter the natural turn-over in the bone by bone scintigraphy.

== Chemistry ==
The drug is a complex of medronic acid (MDP, methylene diphosphonate), the simplest bisphosphonate, with technetium-99m (^{99m}Tc), a radionuclide that emits gamma rays. The exact structure of the complex is not known.

== Manufacture ==
^{99m}Tc-MDP must be prepared in a radiopharmacy. It is usually supplied as a "cold kit" to which radioactive ^{99m}Tc from a generator is added. Kit composition may vary between suppliers, but contents typically includes medronic acid, stannous chloride dihydrate and sometimes ascorbic acid. Pertechnetate, eluted from the generator is added to the kit vial, which is swirled and left to stand. The labelling efficiency, an indication of how much ^{99m}Tc remains in pertechnetate form rather than bound to the MDP, can be measured using chromatography.
