= Medronic acid =

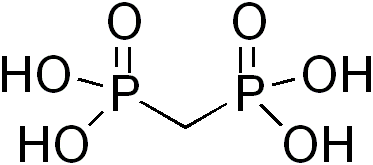

Names
- Preferred IUPAC name Methylenebis(phosphonic acid)
- Other names methanediphosphonic acid; methylene diphosphonate; medronate; phosphonomethylphosphonic acid; MDP

Identifiers
| CAS Number | 1984-15-2 |
| 3D model (JSmol) | Interactive image |
| ChEBI | CHEBI:43945 |
| ChEMBL | ChEMBL180570 |
| ChemSpider | 15308 |
| ECHA InfoCard | 100.016.229 |
| KEGG | D04887 |
| PubChem CID | 16124 |
| UNII | 73OS0QIN3O |
| CompTox Dashboard (EPA) | DTXSID8045696 |
- InChI: InChI=1S/CH6O6P2/c2-8(3,4)1-9(5,6)7/h1H2,(H2,2,3,4)(H2,5,6,7) Key: MBKDYNNUVRNNRF-UHFFFAOYSA-N
- SMILES: O=P(O)(O)CP(=O)(O)O

Properties
| Chemical formula | CH_{6}O_{6}P_{2} |
| Molar mass | 176.001 g·mol^{−1} |
| Melting point | 199 to 200 °C (390 to 392 °F; 472 to 473 K) |

Hazards
- Lethal dose or concentration (LD, LC)
| LD_{50} (median dose) | 45-50 mg/kg (i.v., mice, rabbits) |
- Except where otherwise noted, data are given for materials in their standard state (at 25 °C [77 °F], 100 kPa). verify (what is ?) Infobox references

Medronic acid (conjugate base, medronate), also known as methylene diphosphonate, is the smallest bisphosphonate. Its complex with radioactive technetium, ^{99m}Tc medronic acid, is used in nuclear medicine to detect bone abnormalities, including metastases.
