= Pentetic acid =

DTPA: aminopolycarboxylic acid

- Structure of DTPA

Names
- IUPAC name N,N′-{[(Carboxymethyl)azanediyl]di(ethane-2,1-diyl)}bis[N-(carboxymethyl)glycine]
- Systematic IUPAC name 2,2′,2″,2‴-{[(Carboxymethyl)azanediyl]bis(ethane-2,1-diylnitrilo)}tetraacetic acid
- Other names DTPA; H_{5}dtpa; Diethylenetriaminepentaacetic acid; Penta(carboxymethyl)diethylenetriamine

Identifiers
CAS Number	67-43-6
3D model (JSmol)	Interactive image
ChEBI	CHEBI:35739
ChEMBL	ChEMBL780
ChemSpider	2945
ECHA InfoCard	100.000.593
KEGG	D05422
PubChem CID	3053; 6441444 (Zinc-DTPA)
RTECS number	MB8205000
UNII	7A314HQM0I
CompTox Dashboard (EPA)	DTXSID2023434
- InChI: InChI=1S/C14H23N3O10/c18-10(19)5-15(1-3-16(6-11(20)21)7-12(22)23)2-4-17(8-13(24)25)9-14(26)27/h1-9H2,(H,18,19)(H,20,21)(H,22,23)(H,24,25)(H,26,27) Key: QPCDCPDFJACHGM-UHFFFAOYSA-N
- SMILES: C(CN(CC(=O)O)CC(=O)O)N(CCN(CC(=O)O)CC(=O)O)CC(=O)O

Properties
Chemical formula	C_{14}H_{23}N_{3}O_{10}
Molar mass	393.349 g·mol^{−1}
Appearance	White crystalline solid
Melting point	220 °C (428 °F; 493 K)
Boiling point	decomposes at a higher temp.
Solubility in water	<0.5 g/100 mL
Acidity (pK_{a})	~1.80 (20 °C)

Pharmacology
ATC code	None

Hazards
Flash point	Non-flammable

Related compounds
Related compounds	EDTA, NTA
- Except where otherwise noted, data are given for materials in their standard state (at 25 °C [77 °F], 100 kPa). Infobox references

Pentetic acid or diethylenetriaminepentaacetic acid (DTPA) is an aminopolycarboxylic acid consisting of a diethylenetriamine backbone with five carboxymethyl groups. The molecule can be viewed as an expanded version of EDTA and is used similarly. It is a white solid with limited solubility in water.

== Coordination properties ==
The conjugate base of DTPA has a high affinity for metal cations. Thus, the penta-anion DTPA^{5−} is potentially an octadentate ligand assuming that each nitrogen centre and each –COO^{−} group acts as a centre for coordination. The formation constants for its complexes are about 100 greater than those for EDTA. As a chelating agent, DTPA wraps around a metal ion by forming up to eight bonds. Its complexes can also have an extra water molecule that coordinates the metal ion. Transition metals, however, usually form less than eight coordination bonds. So, after forming a complex with a metal, DTPA still has the ability to bind to other reagents, as is shown by its derivative pendetide. For example, in its complex with copper(II), DTPA binds in a hexadentate manner utilizing the three amine centres and three of the five carboxylates.

The word "DTPA" may sometimes denote DTPA^{5−}. For explicit disambiguation, one can write H_{5}DTPA as opposed to DTPA^{5−}.

== Chelating applications ==
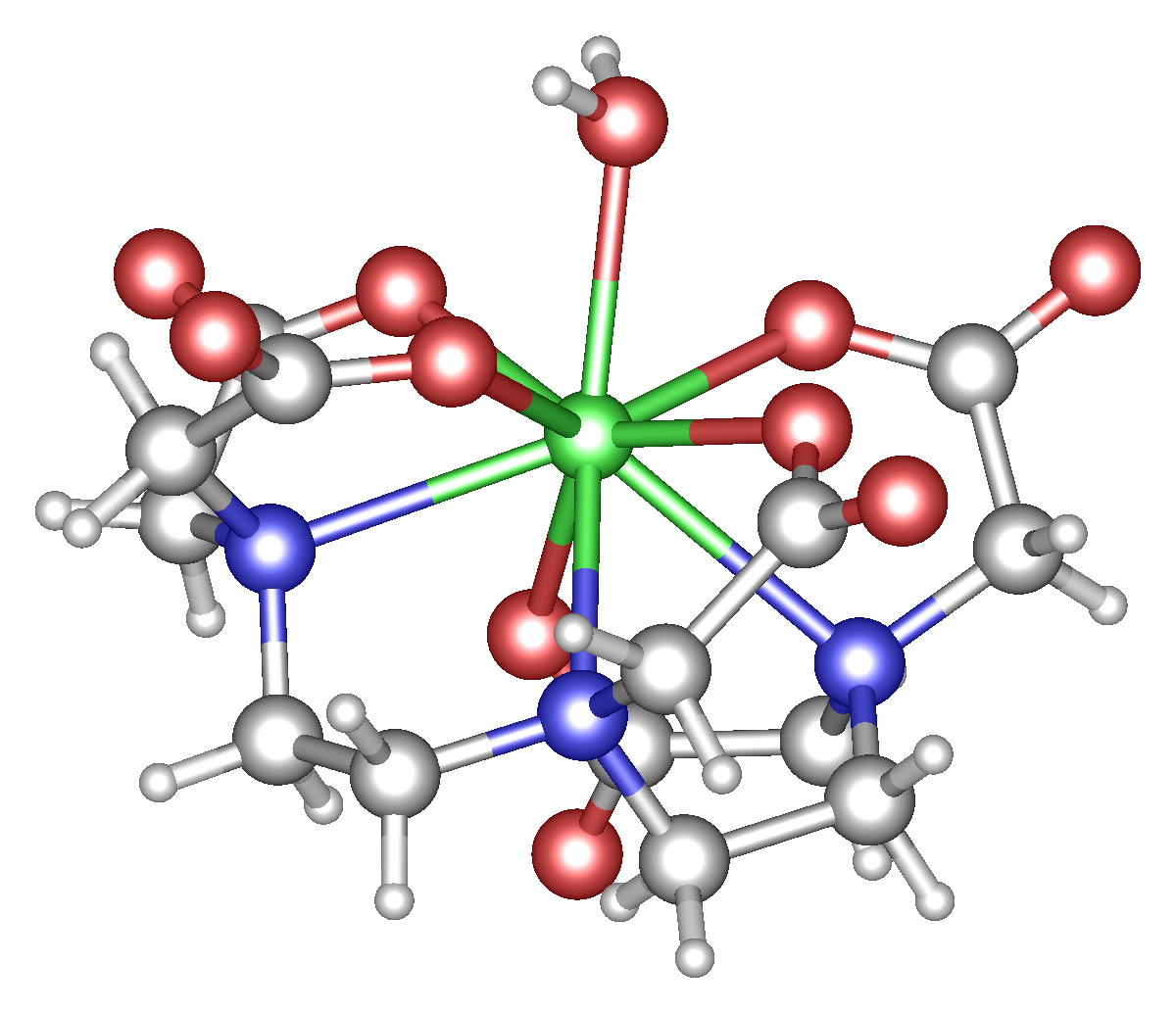
Structure of the ytterbium complex of DTPA^{5-}. Like related lanthanide complexes, the DTPA wraps around the metal ion as a octadentate ligand. Water is also bound to Yb^{3+}, giving it a coordination number of nine. Color code: red = O, blue = N, green = Yb

Like the more common EDTA, DTPA is predominantly used as chelating agent for complexing and sequestering metal ions.

DTPA has been considered for treatment of radioactive materials such as plutonium, americium, and other actinides. In theory, these complexes are more apt to be eliminated in urine. It is normally administered as the calcium or zinc salt (Ca or Zn-DTPA), since these ions are readily displaced by more highly charged cations and mainly to avoid depleting them in the organism. DTPA forms complexes with thorium(IV), uranium(IV), neptunium(IV), and cerium(III/IV).

In August 2004, the U.S. US Food and Drug Administration (USFDA) determined zinc-DTPA and calcium-DTPA to be safe and effective for treatment of those who have breathed in or otherwise been contaminated internally by plutonium, americium, or curium. The recommended treatment is for an initial dose of calcium-DTPA, as this salt of DTPA has been shown to be more effective in the first 24 hours after internal contamination by plutonium, americium, or curium. After that time has elapsed both calcium-DTPA and zinc-DTPA are similarly effective in reducing internal contamination with plutonium, americium or curium, and zinc-DTPA is less likely to deplete the body's normal levels of zinc and other metals essential to health. Each drug can be administered by nebulizer for those who have breathed in contamination, and by intravenous injection for those contaminated by other routes.

Gadolinium (Gd^{3+})-DTPA compounds are MRI contrasting agents.

DTPA under the form of iron(II) chelate (Fe-DTPA, 10–11 wt. %) is also used as aquarium plants fertilizer. The more soluble form of iron, Fe(II), is a micronutrient needed by aquatic plants. By binding to Fe^{2+} ions DTPA prevents their precipitation as Fe(OH)_{3}, or Fe_{2}O_{3}·nH_{2}O poorly soluble oxy-hydroxides after their oxidation by dissolved oxygen. It increases the solubility of Fe^{2+} and Fe^{3+} ions in water, and therefore the bioavailability of iron for aquatic plants. It contributes so to maintain iron under a dissolved form (probably a mix of Fe(II) and Fe(III) DTPA complexes) in the water column. It is unclear to what extent does DTPA really contribute to protect dissolved Fe^{2+} against air oxidation and if the Fe(III)-DTPA complex cannot also be directly assimilated by aquatic plants simply because of its enhanced solubility. Under natural conditions, that is, in the absence of complexing DTPA, Fe^{2+} is more easily assimilated by most organisms, because of its 100-fold higher solubility than that of Fe^{3+}.

In pulp and paper mills DTPA is also used to remove dissolved ferrous and ferric ions (and other redox-active metal ions, such as Mn or Cu) that otherwise would accelerate the catalytic decomposition of hydrogen peroxide (H_{2}O_{2} reduction by Fe^{2+} ions according to the Fenton reaction mechanism). This helps preserving the oxidation capacity of the hydrogen peroxide stock which is used as oxidizing agent to bleach pulp in the chlorine-free process of paper making. Several thousand tons of DTPA are produced annually for this purpose in order to limit the non-negligible losses of H_{2}O_{2} by this mechanism.

DTPA chelating properties are also useful in deactivating calcium and magnesium ions in hair products. DTPA is used in over 150 cosmetic products.

== Biochemistry ==
DTPA is more effective than EDTA to deactivate redox-active metal ions such as Fe(II)/(III), Mn(II)/(IV) and Cu(I)/(II) perpetuating oxidative damages induced in cells by superoxide and hydrogen peroxide. DTPA is also used in bioassays involving redox-active metal ions.

== Environmental impact ==
An unexpected negative environmental impact of chelating agents, as DTPA, is their toxicity for the activated sludges in the treatment of Kraft pulping effluents. Most of the DTPA worldwide production (several thousands of tons) is intended to avoid hydrogen peroxide decomposition by redox-active iron and manganese ions in the chlorine-free Kraft pulping processes (total chlorine free (TCF) and environmental chlorine free (ECF) processes). DTPA decreases the biological oxygen demand (BOD) of activated sludges and therefore their microbial activity.

== Related compounds ==
Compounds that are structurally related to DTPA are used in medicine, taking advantage of the high affinity of the triaminopentacarboxylate scaffold for metal ions.

- In ibritumomab tiuxetan, the chelator tiuxetan is a modified version of DTPA whose carbon backbone contains an isothiocyanatobenzyl and a methyl group.
- In capromab pendetide and satumomab pendetide, the chelator pendetide (GYK-DTPA) is a modified DTPA containing a peptide linker used to connect the chelate to an antibody.
- Pentetreotide is a modified DTPA attached to a peptide segment.
- DTPA and derivatives are used to chelate gadolinium to form an MRI contrast agent, such as Magnevist.
- Technetium-99m is chelated with DTPA for ventilation perfusion (V/Q) scans and radioisotope renography nuclear medicine scans.

== See also ==
- Nuclear medicine
- Radiopharmaceutical
- Hydrogen peroxide decomposition
- DTPA in chlorine-free Kraft pulping
