= Gamma camera =

Camera to record gamma radiation

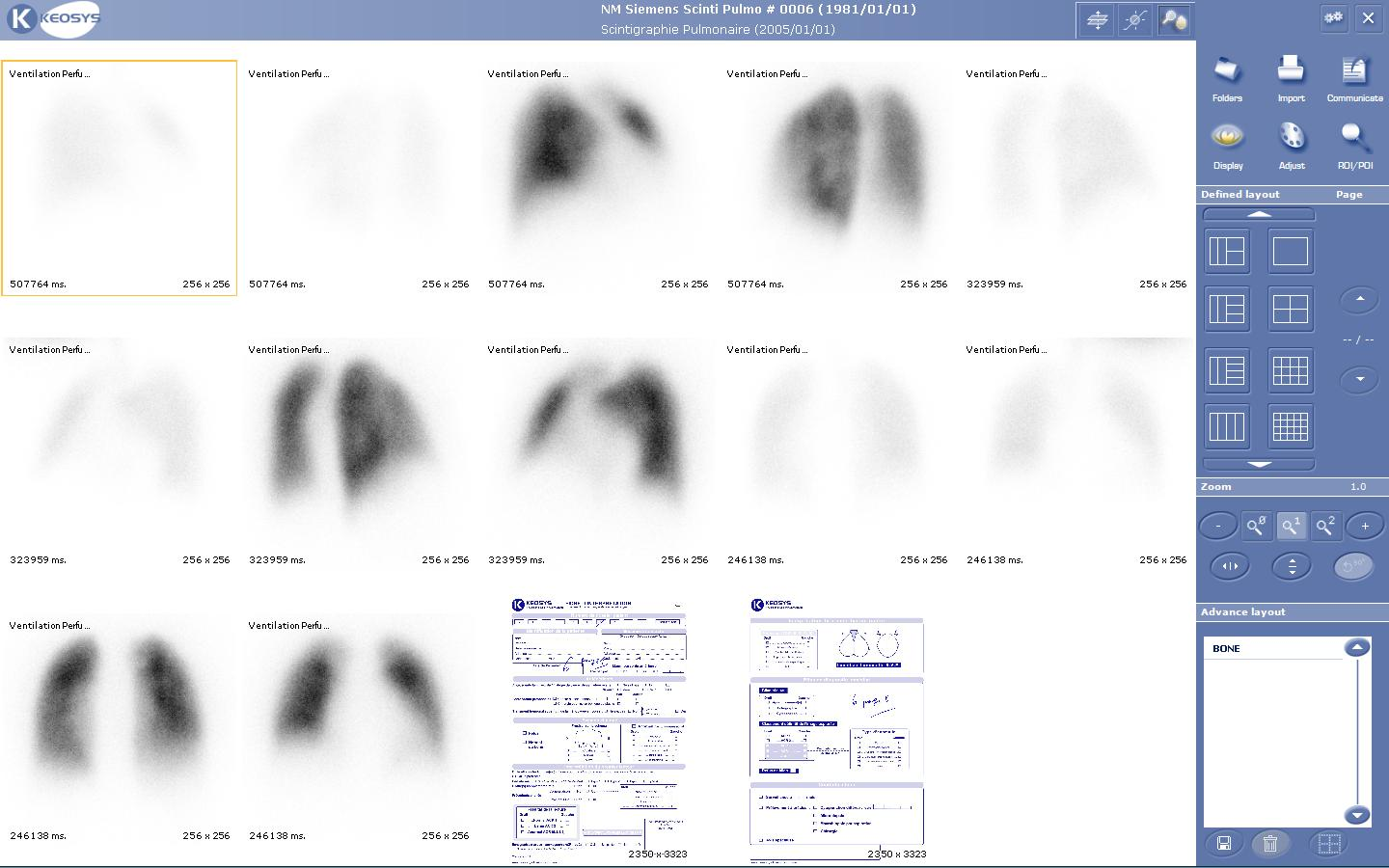
An example of lung scintigraphy examination

A gamma camera (γ-camera), also called a scintillation camera or Anger camera, is a device used to image gamma radiation emitting radioisotopes, a technique known as scintigraphy. The applications of scintigraphy include early drug development and nuclear medical imaging to view and analyse images of the human body or the distribution of medically injected, inhaled, or ingested radionuclides emitting gamma rays.

== Imaging techniques ==
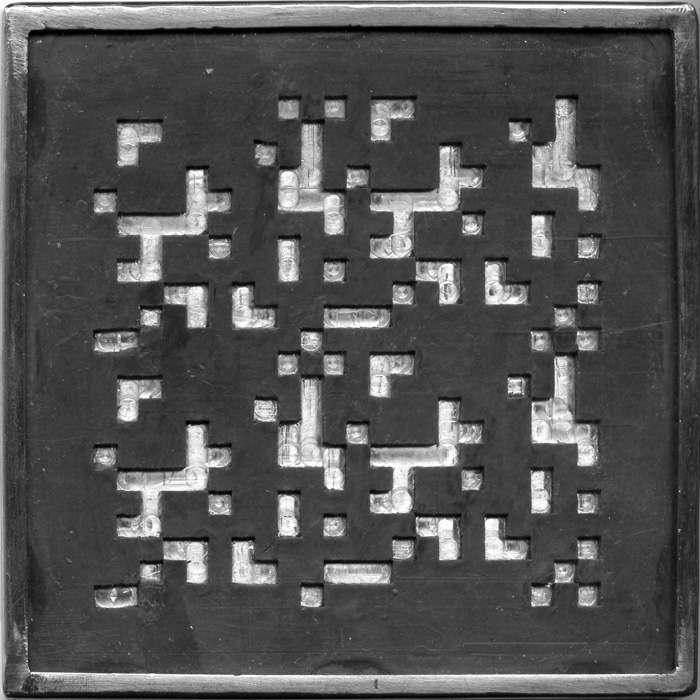
Coded aperture mask for gamma camera (for SPECT)

Scintigraphy ("scint") is the use of gamma cameras to capture emitted radiation from internal radioisotopes to create two-dimensional images.

SPECT (single photon emission computed tomography) imaging, as used in nuclear cardiac stress testing, is performed using gamma cameras. Usually one, two or three detectors or heads, are slowly rotated around the patient.

== Construction ==
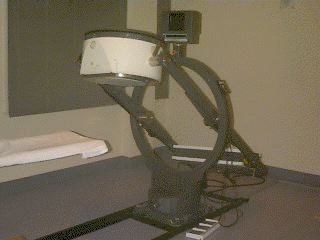
Gamma camera

Diagrammatic cross section of a gamma camera detector

Details of the cross section of a gamma camera

A gamma camera consists of one or more flat crystal planes (or detectors) optically coupled to an array of photomultiplier tubes in an assembly known as a "head", mounted on a gantry. The gantry is connected to a computer system that both controls the operation of the camera and acquires and stores images. The construction of a gamma camera is sometimes known as a compartmental radiation construction.

The system accumulates events, or counts, of gamma photons that are absorbed by the crystal in the camera. Usually a large flat crystal of sodium iodide with thallium doping NaI(Tl) in a light-sealed housing is used. The highly efficient capture method of this combination for detecting gamma rays was discovered in 1944 by Sir Samuel Curran whilst he was working on the Manhattan Project at the University of California at Berkeley. Nobel Prize–winning physicist Robert Hofstadter also worked on the technique in 1948.

The crystal scintillates in response to incident gamma radiation. When a gamma photon leaves the patient (who has been injected with a radioactive pharmaceutical), it knocks an electron loose from an iodine atom in the crystal, and a faint flash of light is produced when the dislocated electron again finds a minimal energy state. The initial phenomenon of the excited electron is similar to the photoelectric effect and (particularly with gamma rays) the Compton effect. After the flash of light is produced, it is detected. Photomultiplier tubes (PMTs) behind the crystal detect the fluorescent flashes (events) and a computer sums the counts. The computer reconstructs and displays a two dimensional image of the relative spatial count density on a monitor. This reconstructed image reflects the distribution and relative concentration of radioactive tracer elements present in the organs and tissues imaged.

Animated schematic of gamma-camera physics and main constituents

== Signal processing ==
Hal Anger developed the first gamma camera in 1957. His original design, frequently called the Anger camera, is still widely used today. The Anger camera uses sets of vacuum tube photomultipliers (PMT). Generally each tube has an exposed face of about 7.6 cm in diameter and the tubes are arranged in hexagon configurations, behind the absorbing crystal. The electronic circuit connecting the photodetectors is wired so as to reflect the relative coincidence of light fluorescence as sensed by the members of the hexagon detector array. All the PMTs simultaneously detect the (presumed) same flash of light to varying degrees, depending on their position from the actual individual event. Thus the spatial location of each single flash of fluorescence is reflected as a pattern of voltages within the interconnecting circuit array.

The location of the interaction between the gamma ray and the crystal can be determined by processing the voltage signals from the photomultipliers; in simple terms, the location can be found by weighting the position of each photomultiplier tube by the strength of its signal, and then calculating a mean position from the weighted positions. The total sum of the voltages from each photomultiplier, measured by a pulse height analyzer is proportional to the energy of the gamma ray interaction, thus allowing discrimination between different isotopes or between scattered and direct photons.

== Spatial resolution ==
In order to obtain spatial information about the gamma-ray emissions from an imaging subject (e.g. a person's heart muscle cells which have absorbed an intravenous injected radioactive, usually thallium-201 or technetium-99m, medicinal imaging agent) a method of correlating the detected photons with their point of origin is required.

The conventional method is to place a collimator over the detection crystal/PMT array. The collimator consists of a thick sheet of lead, typically 25 to 55 millimetres (1 to 2.2 in) thick, with thousands of adjacent holes through it. There are three types of collimators: low energy, medium energy, and high energy collimators. As the collimators transitioned from low energy to high energy, the hole sizes, thickness, and septations between the holes also increased. Given a fixed septal thickness, the collimator resolution decreases with increased efficiency and also increasing distance of the source from the collimator. Pulse-height analyser determines the Full width at half maximum that selects certain photons to contribute to the final image, thus determining the collimator resolution.

The individual holes limit photons which can be detected by the crystal to a cone shape; the point of the cone is at the midline center of any given hole and extends from the collimator surface outward. However, the collimator is also one of the sources of blurring within the image; lead does not totally attenuate incident gamma photons, there can be some crosstalk between holes.

Unlike a lens, as used in visible light cameras, the collimator attenuates most (>99%) of incident photons and thus greatly limits the sensitivity of the camera system. Large amounts of radiation must be present so as to provide enough exposure for the camera system to detect sufficient scintillation dots to form a picture.

Other methods of image localization (pinhole, rotating slat collimator with CZT) have been proposed and tested; however, none have entered widespread routine clinical use.

The best current camera system designs can differentiate two separate point sources of gamma photons located at 6 to 12 mm depending on distance from the collimator, the type of collimator and radio-nucleide. Spatial resolution decreases rapidly at increasing distances from the camera face. This limits the spatial accuracy of the computer image: it is a fuzzy image made up of many dots of detected but not precisely located scintillation. This is a major limitation for heart muscle imaging systems; the thickest normal heart muscle in the left ventricle is about 1.2 cm and most of the left ventricle muscle is about 0.8 cm, always moving and much of it beyond 5 cm from the collimator face. To help compensate, better imaging systems limit scintillation counting to a portion of the heart contraction cycle, called gating, however this further limits system sensitivity.

== See also ==
- Nuclear medicine
- Scintigraphy
