= Snapshot hyperspectral imaging =

Method for capturing hyperspectral images

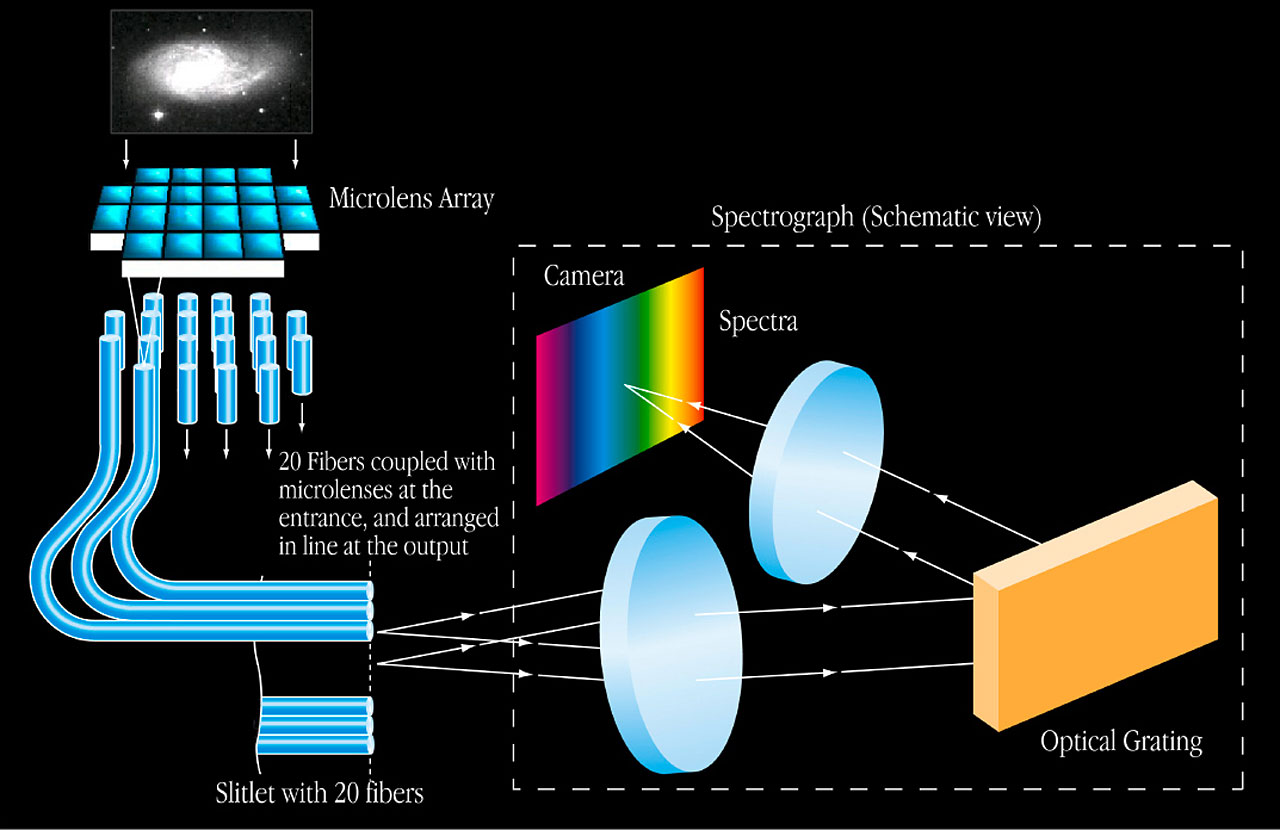
Example of a snapshot hyperspectral imaging spectrometer. The scene is viewed through a lenslet array. Each lenslet transmits the light it receives to the fiber to which it is coupled. The bundle of fibers is reformatted and lined up at the entrance slit of a conventional grating spectrometer, which disperses the light across the entrance slit onto its detector.

Snapshot hyperspectral imaging is a method for capturing hyperspectral images during a single integration time of a detector array. No scanning is involved with this method, in contrast to push broom and whisk broom scanning techniques. The lack of moving parts means that motion artifacts should be avoided. This instrument typically features detector arrays with a high number of pixels.

== Development ==
Although the first known reference to a snapshot hyperspectral imaging device—the Bowen "image slicer"—dates from 1938, the concept was not successful until a larger amount of spatial resolution was available. With the arrival of large-format detector arrays in the late 1980s and early 1990s, a series of new snapshot hyperspectral imaging techniques were developed to take advantage of the new technology: a method which uses a fiber bundle at the image plane and reformatting the fibers in the opposite end of the bundle to a long line, viewing a scene through a 2D grating and reconstructing the multiplexed data with computed tomography mathematics, the (lenslet-based) integral field spectrograph, a modernized version of Bowen's image slicer. More recently, a number of research groups have attempted to advance the technology in order to create devices capable of commercial use. These newer devices include the HyperPixel Array imager a derivative of the integral field spectrograph, a multiaperture spectral filter approach, a compressive-sensing–based approach using a coded aperture, a microfaceted-mirror-based approach, a generalization of the Lyot filter, and a generalization of the Bayer filter approach to multispectral filtering.

Slitless spectroscopy can be considered a basic snapshot hyperspectral imaging technique. Spaced point-like sources, such as a sparse field of stars, is a requirement to avoid spectrum overlap on the detector.

== Applications ==
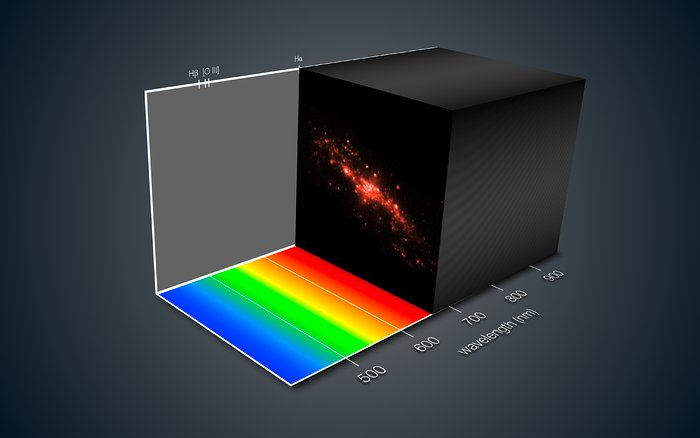
Data cube acquired by the Very Large Telescope.

While snapshot instruments are featured prominently in the research literature, none of these instruments have seen wide adoption in commercial use (i.e. outside the professional astronomical community) due to manufacturing limitations. Thus, their primary venue continues to be astronomical telescopes. One of the main reasons for the popularity of snapshot devices in the astronomical community is that they offer large increases in the light collection capacity of a telescope when performing hyperspectral imaging. Recent applications have been in soil spectroscopy and vegetation sciences. More recently, snapshot hyperspectral sensors have attracted growing research interest in the context of automotive and autonomous driving applications. Studies suggest that hyperspectral data can enhance perception tasks such as object detection and semantic segmentation by providing material-specific information that is not available in conventional RGB imagery. Comparative evaluations between hyperspectral and RGB modalities indicate potential performance gains in challenging urban scenarios, particularly for pedestrian segmentation and scene understanding.

== See also ==
- Chemical imaging
- Computed tomography imaging spectrometer
- Imaging spectrometer
- Imaging spectroscopy
- Multi-spectral image
- Spectral imaging
- Video spectroscopy
