= Chemical imaging =

Simultaneous measurement of spectra and pictures

Chemical imaging (as quantitative – chemical mapping) is the analytical capability to create a visual image of components distribution from simultaneous measurement of spectra and spatial, time information. Hyperspectral imaging measures contiguous spectral bands, as opposed to multispectral imaging which measures spaced spectral bands.

The main idea - for chemical imaging, the analyst may choose to take as many data spectrum measured at a particular chemical component in spatial location at time; this is useful for chemical identification and quantification. Alternatively, selecting an image plane at a particular data spectrum (PCA - multivariable data of wavelength, spatial location at time) can map the spatial distribution of sample components, provided that their spectral signatures are different at the selected data spectrum.

Software for chemical imaging is most specific and distinguished from chemical methods such as chemometrics.

Imaging instrumentation has three components: a radiation source to illuminate the sample, a spectrally selective element, and usually a detector array (the camera) to collect the images. The data format is called a hypercube. The data set may be visualized as a data cube, a three-dimensional block of data spanning two spatial dimensions (x and y), with a series of wavelengths (lambda) making up the third (spectral) axis. The hypercube can be visually and mathematically treated as a series of spectrally resolved images (each image plane corresponding to the image at one wavelength) or a series of spatially resolved spectra.

== History ==
Commercially available laboratory-based chemical imaging systems emerged in the early 1990s (ref. 1-5). In addition to economic factors, such as the need for sophisticated electronics and extremely high-end computers, a significant barrier to commercialization of infrared imaging was that the focal plane array (FPA) needed to read IR images were not readily available as commercial items. As high-speed electronics and sophisticated computers became more commonplace, and infrared cameras became readily commercially available, laboratory chemical imaging systems were introduced.

Initially used for novel research in specialized laboratories, chemical imaging became a more commonplace analytical technique used for general R&D, quality assurance (QA) and quality control (QC) in less than a decade. The rapid acceptance of the technology in a variety of industries (pharmaceutical, polymers, semiconductors, security, forensics and agriculture) rests in the wealth of information characterizing both chemical composition and morphology. The parallel nature of chemical imaging data makes it possible to analyze multiple samples simultaneously for applications that require high throughput analysis in addition to characterizing a single sample.

== Applications ==
Hyperspectral imaging is most often applied to either solid or gel samples, and has applications in chemistry, biology, medicine, pharmacy (see also for example: food science, biotechnology, agriculture and industry. NIR, IR and Raman chemical imaging is also referred to as hyperspectral, spectroscopic, spectral or multispectral imaging (also see microspectroscopy). However, other ultra-sensitive and selective imaging techniques are also in use that involve either UV-visible or fluorescence microspectroscopy. Many imaging techniques can be used to analyze samples of all sizes, from the single molecule to the cellular level in biology and medicine, and to images of planetary systems in astronomy, but different instrumentation is employed for making observations on such widely different systems.

Any material that depends on chemical gradients for functionality may be amenable to study by an analytical technique that couples spatial and chemical characterization. To efficiently and effectively design and manufacture such materials, the 'what' and the 'where' must both be measured. The demand for this type of analysis is increasing as manufactured materials become more complex. Chemical imaging techniques are critical to understanding modern manufactured products and in some cases is a non-destructive technique so that samples are preserved for further testing.

Many materials, both manufactured and naturally occurring, derive their functionality from the spatial distribution of sample components. For example, extended release pharmaceutical formulations can be achieved by using a coating that acts as a barrier layer. The release of active ingredient is controlled by the presence of this barrier, and imperfections in the coating, such as discontinuities, may result in altered performance. In the semi-conductor industry, irregularities or contaminants in silicon wafers or printed micro-circuits can lead to failure of these components. The functionality of biological systems is also dependent upon chemical gradients – a single cell, tissue, and even whole organs function because of the very specific arrangement of components. It has been shown that even small changes in chemical composition and distribution may be an early indicator of disease.

== Principles ==
Chemical imaging shares the fundamentals of vibrational spectroscopic techniques, but provides additional information by way of the simultaneous acquisition of spatially resolved spectra. It combines the advantages of digital imaging with the attributes of spectroscopic measurements. Briefly, vibrational spectroscopy measures the interaction of light with matter. Photons that interact with a sample are either absorbed or scattered; photons of specific energy are absorbed, and the pattern of absorption provides information, or a fingerprint, on the molecules that are present in the sample.

On the other hand, in terms of the observation setup, chemical imaging can be carried out in one of the following modes: (optical) absorption, emission (fluorescence), (optical) transmission or scattering (Raman). A consensus currently exists that the fluorescence (emission) and Raman scattering modes are the most sensitive and powerful, but also the most expensive.

In a transmission measurement, the radiation goes through a sample and is measured by a detector placed on the far side of the sample. The energy transferred from the incoming radiation to the molecule(s) can be calculated as the difference between the quantity of photons that were emitted by the source and the quantity that is measured by the detector. In a diffuse reflectance measurement, the same energy difference measurement is made, but the source and detector are located on the same side of the sample, and the photons that are measured have re-emerged from the illuminated side of the sample rather than passed through it. The energy may be measured at one or multiple wavelengths; when a series of measurements are made, the response curve is called a spectrum.

A key element in acquiring spectra is that the radiation must somehow be energy selected – either before or after interacting with the sample. Wavelength selection can be accomplished with a fixed filter, tunable filter, spectrograph, an interferometer, or other devices. For a fixed filter approach, it is not efficient to collect a significant number of wavelengths, and multispectral data are usually collected. Interferometer-based chemical imaging requires that entire spectral ranges be collected, and therefore results in hyperspectral data. Tunable filters have the flexibility to provide either multi- or hyperspectral data, depending on analytical requirements.

Spectra are typically measured with an imaging spectrometer, based on a Focal Plane Array.

=== Terminology ===
Some words common in spectroscopy, optical microscopy and photography have been adapted or their scope modified for their use in chemical imaging. They include: resolution, field of view and magnification. There are two types of resolution in chemical imaging. The spectral resolution refers to the ability to resolve small energy differences; it applies to the spectral axis. The spatial resolution is the minimum distance between two objects that is required for them to be detected as distinct objects. The spatial resolution is influenced by the field of view, a physical measure of the size of the area probed by the analysis. In imaging, the field of view is a product of the magnification and the number of pixels in the detector array. The magnification is a ratio of the physical area of the detector array divided by the area of the sample field of view. Higher magnifications for the same detector image a smaller area of the sample.

=== Types of vibrational chemical imaging instruments ===
Chemical imaging has been implemented for mid-infrared, near-infrared spectroscopy and Raman spectroscopy. As with their bulk spectroscopy counterparts, each imaging technique has particular strengths and weaknesses, and are best suited to fulfill different needs.

==== Mid-infrared chemical imaging ====
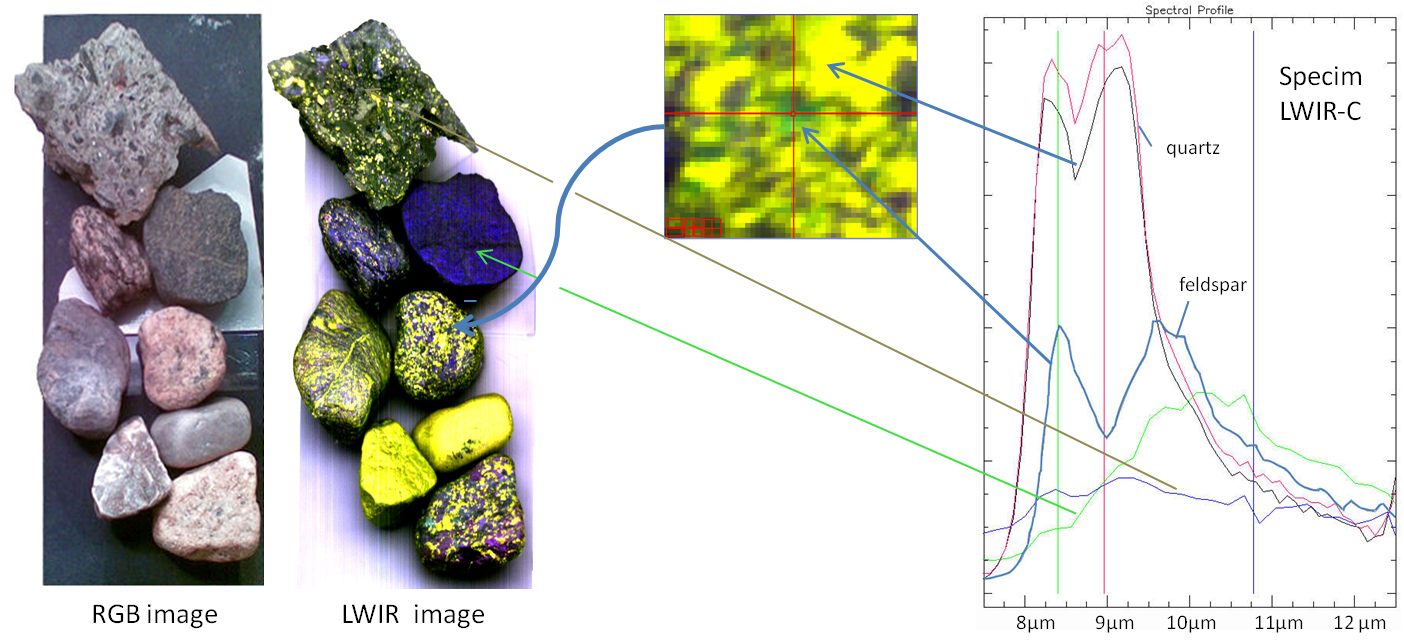
A set of stones scanned with a Specim LWIR-C hyperspectral imager in the thermal infrared range from 7.7 μm to 12.4 μm. Minerals such as quartz and feldspar spectra are clearly recognizable.

Mid-infrared (MIR) spectroscopy probes fundamental molecular vibrations, which arise in the spectral range 2,500-25,000 nm. Commercial imaging implementations in the MIR region employ hyperspectral imagers or Fourier Transform Infrared (FT-IR) interferometers, depending on the application. The MIR absorption bands tend to be relatively narrow and well-resolved; direct spectral interpretation is often possible by an experienced spectroscopist. MIR spectroscopy can distinguish subtle changes in chemistry and structure, and is often used for the identification of unknown materials. The absorptions in this spectral range are relatively strong; for this reason, sample presentation is important to limit the amount of material interacting with the incoming radiation in the MIR region. Data can be collected in reflectance, transmission, or emission mode. Water is a very strong absorber of MIR radiation and wet samples often require advanced sampling procedures (such as attenuated total reflectance). Commercial instruments include point and line mapping, and imaging. Mid-infrared chemical imaging can also be performed with nanometer level spatial resolution using atomic force microscope based infrared spectroscopy (AFM-IR). Hyperspectral imaging of the entire bandwidth of the mid-infrared can be achieved within seconds using ultrashort mid-infrared pulses.

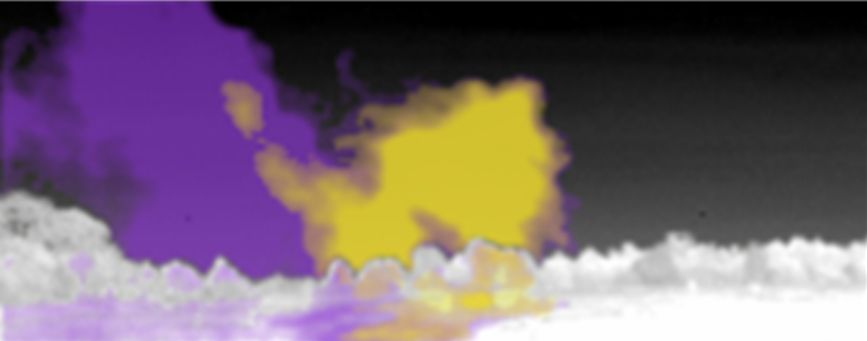
Remote chemical imaging of a simultaneous release of SF_{6} and NH_{3} at 1.5km using the Telops Hyper-Cam imaging spectrometer

For types of MIR microscope, see Microscopy#Infrared microscopy.

Atmospheric windows in the infrared spectrum are also employed to perform chemical imaging remotely. In these spectral regions the atmospheric gases (mainly water and CO_{2}) present low absorption and allow infrared viewing over kilometer distances. Target molecules can then be viewed using the selective absorption/emission processes described above. An example of the chemical imaging of a simultaneous release of SF_{6} and NH_{3} is shown in the image.

==== Near-infrared chemical imaging ====
The analytical near infrared (NIR) region spans the range from 780 nm to 2,500 nm. The absorption bands seen in this spectral range arise from overtones and combination bands of O-H, N-H, C-H and S-H stretching and bending vibrations. Absorption is one to two orders of magnitude smaller in the NIR compared to the MIR; this phenomenon eliminates the need for extensive sample preparation. Thick and thin samples can be analyzed without any sample preparation, it is possible to acquire NIR chemical images through some packaging materials, and the technique can be used to examine hydrated samples, within limits. Intact samples can be imaged in transmittance or diffuse reflectance.

The lineshapes for overtone and combination bands tend to be much broader and more overlapped than for the fundamental bands seen in the MIR. Often, multivariate methods are used to separate spectral signatures of sample components. NIR chemical imaging is particularly useful for performing rapid, reproducible and non-destructive analyses of known materials. NIR imaging instruments are typically based on a hyperspectral camera, a tunable filter or an FT-IR interferometer. External light source is always needed, such as sun (outdoor scans, remote sensing) or a halogen lamp (laboratory, industrial measurements).

==== Raman chemical imaging ====
The Raman shift chemical imaging spectral range spans from approximately 50 to 4,000 cm^{−1}; the actual spectral range over which a particular Raman measurement is made is a function of the laser excitation frequency. The basic principle behind Raman spectroscopy differs from the MIR and NIR in that the x-axis of the Raman spectrum is measured as a function of energy shift (in cm^{−1}) relative to the frequency of the laser used as the source of radiation. Briefly, the Raman spectrum arises from inelastic scattering of incident photons, which requires a change in polarizability with vibration, as opposed to infrared absorption, which requires a change in dipole moment with vibration. The end result is spectral information that is similar and in many cases complementary to the MIR. The Raman effect is weak - only about one in 10^{7} photons incident to the sample undergoes Raman scattering. Both organic and inorganic materials possess a Raman spectrum; they generally produce sharp bands that are chemically specific. Fluorescence is a competing phenomenon and, depending on the sample, can overwhelm the Raman signal, for both bulk spectroscopy and imaging implementations.

Raman chemical imaging requires little or no sample preparation. However, physical sample sectioning may be used to expose the surface of interest, with care taken to obtain a surface that is as flat as possible. The conditions required for a particular measurement dictate the level of invasiveness of the technique, and samples that are sensitive to high power laser radiation may be damaged during analysis. It is relatively insensitive to the presence of water in the sample and is therefore useful for imaging samples that contain water such as biological material.

=== Fluorescence Imaging (Ultraviolet, visible and near infrared regions) ===
Emission microspectroscopy is a sensitive technique with excitation and emission ranging from the ultraviolet, visible and NIR regions. As such, it has numerous biomedical, biotechnological and agricultural applications. There are several powerful, highly specific and sensitive fluorescence techniques that are currently in use, or still being developed; among the former are FLIM, FRAP, FRET and FLIM-FRET; among the latter are NIR fluorescence and probe-sensitivity enhanced NIR fluorescence microspectroscopy and nanospectroscopy techniques (see "Further reading" section). Fluorescence emission microspectroscopy and imaging are also commonly used to locate protein crystals in solution, for the characterization of metamaterials and biotechnology devices.

== Sampling and samples ==
The value of imaging lies in the ability to resolve spatial heterogeneities in solid-state or gel/gel-like samples. Imaging a liquid or even a suspension has limited use as constant sample motion serves to average spatial information, unless ultra-fast recording techniques are employed as in fluorescence correlation microspectroscopy or FLIM observations where a single molecule may be monitored at extremely high (photon) detection speed. High-throughput experiments (such as imaging multi-well plates) of liquid samples can however provide valuable information. In this case, the parallel acquisition of thousands of spectra can be used to compare differences between samples, rather than the more common implementation of exploring spatial heterogeneity within a single sample.

Similarly, there is no benefit in imaging a truly homogeneous sample, as a single point spectrometer will generate the same spectral information. Of course the definition of homogeneity is dependent on the spatial resolution of the imaging system employed. For MIR imaging, where wavelengths span from 3-10 micrometres, objects on the order of 5 micrometres may theoretically be resolved. The sampled areas are limited by current experimental implementations because illumination is provided by the interferometer. Raman imaging may be able to resolve particles less than 1 micrometre in size, but the sample area that can be illuminated is severely limited. With Raman imaging, it is considered impractical to image large areas and, consequently, large samples. FT-NIR chemical/hyperspectral imaging usually resolves only larger objects (>10 micrometres), and is better suited for large samples because illumination sources are readily available. However, FT-NIR microspectroscopy was recently reported to be capable of about 1.2 micron (micrometer) resolution in biological samples Furthermore, two-photon excitation FCS experiments were reported to have attained 15 nanometer resolution on biomembrane thin films with a special coincidence photon-counting setup.

=== Detection limit ===
The concept of the detection limit for chemical imaging is quite different from for bulk spectroscopy, as it depends on the sample itself. Because a bulk spectrum represents an average of the materials present, the spectral signatures of trace components are simply overwhelmed by dilution. In imaging however, each pixel has a corresponding spectrum. If the physical size of the trace contaminant is on the order of the pixel size imaged on the sample, its spectral signature will likely be detectable. If however, the trace component is dispersed homogeneously (relative to pixel image size) throughout a sample, it will not be detectable. Therefore, detection limits of chemical imaging techniques are strongly influenced by particle size, the chemical and spatial heterogeneity of the sample, and the spatial resolution of the image.

=== Data analysis ===
Data analysis methods for chemical imaging data sets typically employ mathematical algorithms common to single point spectroscopy or to image analysis. The reasoning is that the spectrum acquired by each detector is equivalent to a single point spectrum; therefore pre-processing, chemometrics and pattern recognition techniques are utilized with the similar goal to separate chemical and physical effects and perform a qualitative or quantitative characterization of individual sample components. In the spatial dimension, each chemical image is equivalent to a digital image and standard image analysis and robust statistical analysis can be used for feature extraction.

==== Software ====
- FECOM Object Learning Software (OLS), industrial in-line hyperspectral feature processing
- UmBio Evince Image, multivariate hyperspectral image analysis
- Perception System; in-line hyperspectral imaging for industry

== See also ==
- Multispectral image
- Ultraviolet-visible Microspectroscopy
- Imaging spectroscopy
- Hyperspectral imaging
- Laser Direct Infrared (LDIR) Imaging
- Thermal infrared spectroscopy
- AFM-IR (atomic force microscope based infrared spectroscopy)
