= Spatiospectral scanning =

Technique for hyperspectral imaging

Spatio-spectral scanning is one of four techniques for hyperspectral imaging, the other three being spatial scanning, spectral scanning and non-scanning, or snapshot hyperspectral imaging.

The technique was designed to put into practice the concept of 'tilted sampling' of the hyperspectral data cube, which had been deemed difficult to achieve. Spatio-spectral scanning yields a series of thin, diagonal slices of the data cube. Figuratively speaking, each acquired image is a 'rainbow-colored' spatial map of the scene. More precisely, each image represents two spatial dimensions, one of which is wavelength-coded. To acquire the spectrum of a given object point, scanning is needed.

Spatio-spectral scanning combines some advantages of spatial and spectral scanning: Depending on the context of application, one can choose between a mobile and a stationary platform. Moreover, each image is a spatial map of the scene, facilitating pointing, focusing, and data analysis. This is particularly valuable for irregular or irretrievable scanning movements. Being based on dispersion, spatio-spectral scanning systems yield high spatial and spectral resolution.

== Prototypical system ==
A prototypical spatio-spectral scanning system, introduced in June 2014, consists of a basic slit spectroscope (slit + dispersive element) at some suitable, non-zero distance before a camera. (If the effective camera distance is zero, the system is applicable to spatial scanning). The imaging process is based on spectrally-decoded camera obscura projections: A series of projections from a continuous array of pinholes (= the slit) is projected onto the dispersive element, each projection contributing a rainbow-colored strip to the recorded two-dimensional image. The field of view in the wavelength-coded spatial dimension asymptotically approaches the dispersion angle of the dispersive element as the camera distance from the dispersive element approaches infinity. Scanning is achieved by moving the camera transverse to the slit (stationary platform), or by moving the entire system transverse to the slit (mobile platform).

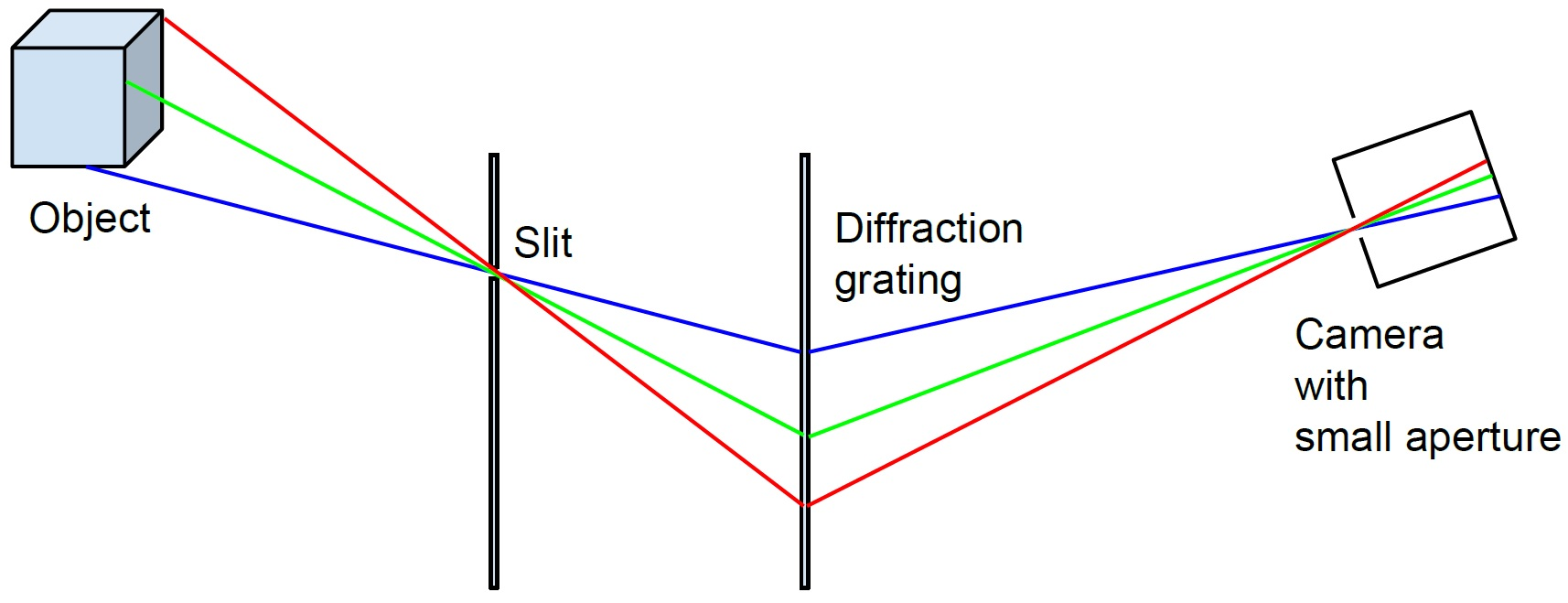
Schematic of the prototypical setup. Spatiospectral scanning is achieved by moving the camera or the whole system along the direction of dispersion.

== Advanced system ==
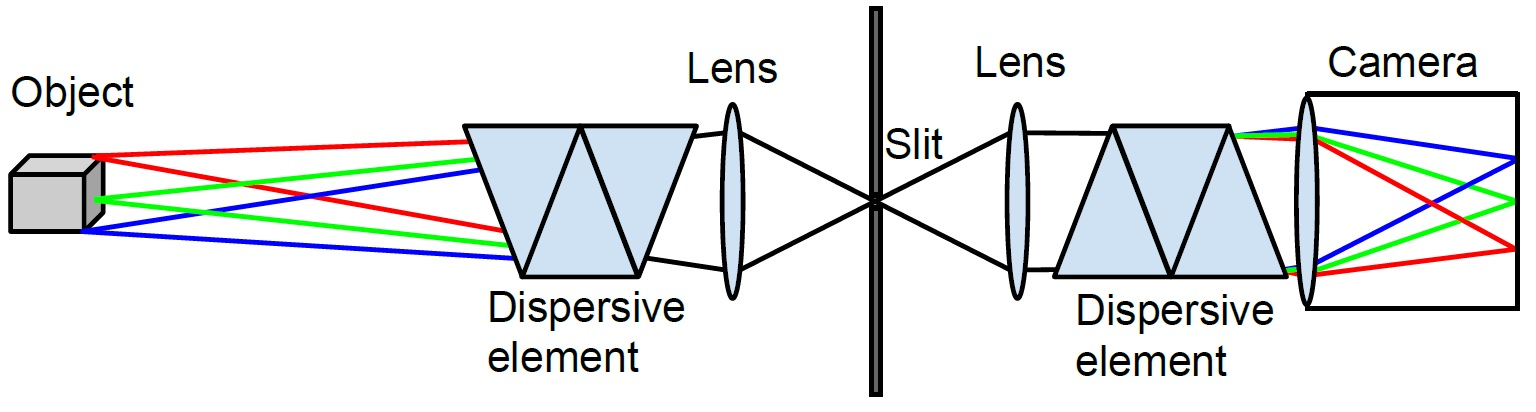
Schematic of the advanced setup. The first lens images the object onto the slit plane. The first dispersive element disperses this image. The camera produces an image of the slit plane, the second dispersive element disperses the slit image, thereby creating a rainbow-colored image of the object.

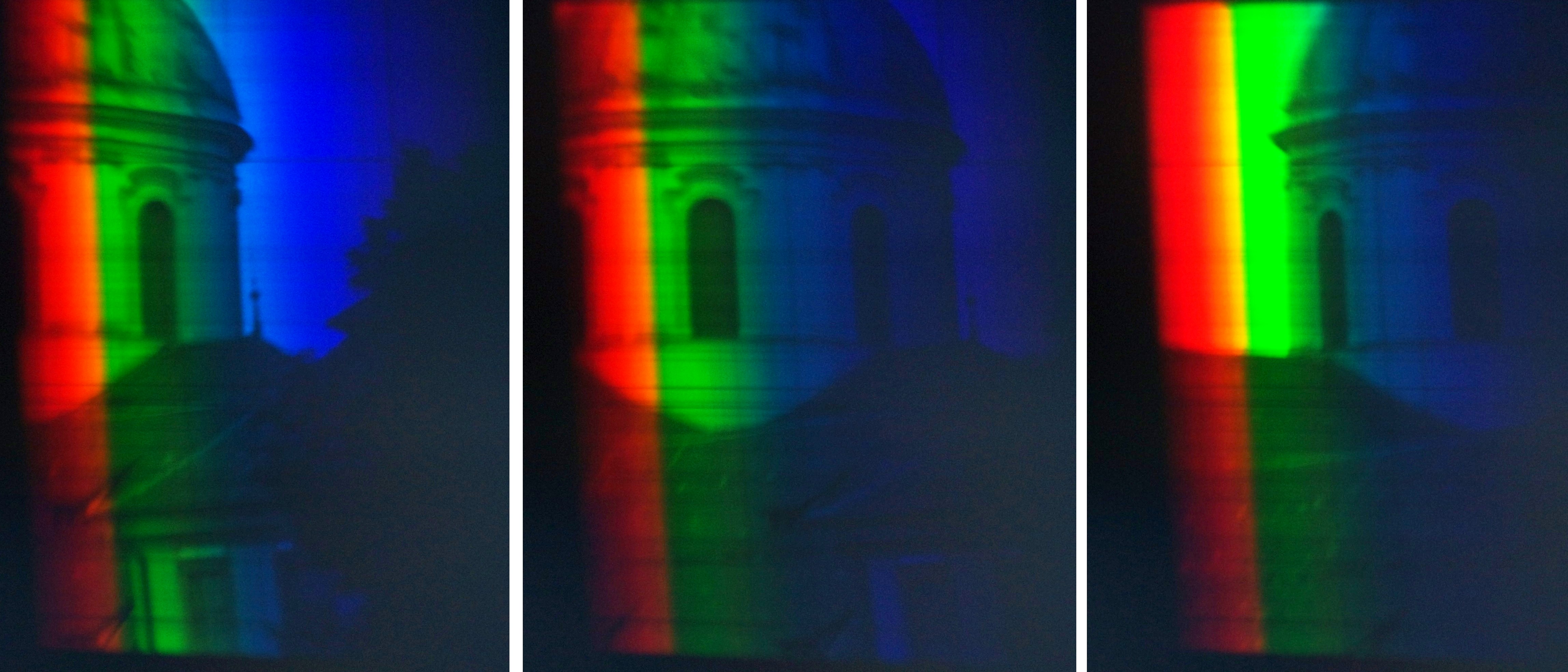
Spatiospectral images of the basilica of Weingarten (Germany), obtained with the advanced setup.

An advanced spatio-spectral scanning system, proposed in June 2014, consists of a dispersive element before a spatial scanning system. (This allows for easy switching between spatial and spatio-spectral scanning). The imaging process is based on spectral analysis of a strip of a dispersed image of the scene. The field of view in the wavelength-coded spatial dimension equals the dispersion angle of the dispersive element. As in the more basic system, scanning is achieved by transverse movement of the slit or by moving the system relative to the scene.
