= Dimitris Manolakis =

Dimitris Manolakis from the MIT Lincoln Laboratory was named Fellow of the Institute of Electrical and Electronics Engineers (IEEE) in 2016 for contributions to signal processing education, algorithms for adaptive filtering, and hyperspectral imaging.
