= Thermal infrared spectroscopy =

Measurement of thermal radiation emitted from materials

Thermal infrared spectroscopy (TIR spectroscopy) is the subset of infrared spectroscopy that deals with radiation emitted in the infrared part of the electromagnetic spectrum. The emitted infrared radiation, though similar to blackbody radiation, is different in that the radiation is banded at characteristic vibrations in the material. The method measures the thermal infrared radiation emitted (as opposed to being transmitted or reflected) from a volume or surface. This method is commonly used to identify the composition of surface by analyzing its spectrum and comparing it to previously measured materials. It is particularly suited to airborne and spaceborne applications.

== Thermal infrared spectrometers ==
=== Airborne ===
- HyTES: the Hyperspectral Thermal Emission Spectrometer operated by JPL and flown on a Twin Otter or ER2 aircraft
- TIMS: the Thermal Infrared Multispectral Scanner, a multispectral radiometer flown on C-130, ER-2, and the Stennis Learjet aircraft.
- SEBASS: a hyperspectral sensor developed and operated by The Aerospace Corporation.
- Hyper-Cam: a hyperspectral thermal infrared camera developed by Telops.
- OWL: a hyperspectral thermal infrared camera developed by Specim.

=== Spaceborne ===
- ISM: An imaging spectrometer on board the Soviet Phobos 2 spacecraft.
- ASTER: a multispectral radiometer on board the Earth-observing Terra satellite.
- TIS: A spectrometer is on board the Mangalyan spacecraft.
- TES: A hyperspectral spectrometer on board the Mars Global Surveyor spacecraft.
- Mini-TES: a small version of the TES instrument carried on both Mars Exploration Rovers.
- THEMIS: a multispectral thermal infrared imager on board the 2001 Mars Odyssey spacecraft.
- OTES: thermal spectroscopy aboard OSIRIS-REx spacecraft
