= Video spectroscopy =

Spectroscopic measurements with video technique

Video spectroscopy integrates spectroscopic measurements with video technique. This technology arises from recent advancements in hyperspectral imaging. A video-capable imaging spectrometer functions like a camcorder, providing full-frame spectral images in real-time, which enables advanced mobility, including vehicle-based and hand-held imaging spectroscopy. Unlike hyperspectral line scanners, a video spectrometer can spectrally capture and process randomly moving objects quickly. The output of a conventional hyperspectral line scanner is typically referred to as a hyperspectral data cube. A video spectrometer generates a spectral image data series at much higher speeds (1 ms) and frequencies (25 Hz), known as hyperspectral video. This technology can lead to novel solutions and present new challenges in spectral tracking, field spectroscopy, spectral mobile mapping, real-time spectral monitoring, and many other applications.

== See also ==
- Snapshot hyperspectral imaging
- Hyperspectral imaging
- Imaging spectroscopy
- Hyperspectral systems
