= Spectral signature =

Variation of reflectance or emittance of a material with respect to wavelengths

Spectrum of blue sky

Spectral signature is the variation of reflectance or emittance of a material with respect to wavelengths (i.e., reflectance/emittance as a function of wavelength). The spectral signature of stars indicates the composition of the stellar atmosphere. The spectral signature of an object is a function of the incidental EM wavelength and material interaction with that section of the electromagnetic spectrum.

The measurements can be made with various instruments, including a task specific spectrometer, although the most common method is separation of the red, green, blue and near infrared portion of the EM spectrum as acquired by digital cameras. Calibrating spectral signatures under specific illumination are collected in order to apply a correction to airborne or satellite imagery digital images.

The user of one kind of spectroscope looks through it at a tube of ionized gas. The user sees specific lines of colour falling on a graduated scale. Each substance will have its own unique pattern of spectral lines.

Most remote sensing applications process digital images to extract spectral signatures at each pixel and use them to divide the image in groups of similar pixels (segmentation) using different approaches. As a last step, they assign a class to each group (classification) by comparing with known spectral signatures. Depending on pixel resolution, a pixel can represent many spectral signature "mixed" together - that is why much remote sensing analysis is done to "unmix mixtures". Ultimately correct matching of spectral signature recorded by image pixel with spectral signature of existing elements leads to accurate classification in remote sensing.

== See also ==
- Spectroscopy
- Spectral imaging
- Hyperspectral imaging
- Multispectral image
