= HyMap =

Australian airborne hyperspectral imaging sensor

HyMap is an airborne hyperspectral imaging sensor that was developed in Australia and is manufactured by Integrated Spectronics. HyMap data has 126 spectral bands spanning the wavelength interval 0.45–2.5 μm, and 5 metres spatial resolution. It is one of the few hyperspectral sensors that has been commercially deployed, and is thus the subject of a great deal of research in the earth observation field at present.
