= Imaging spectrometer =

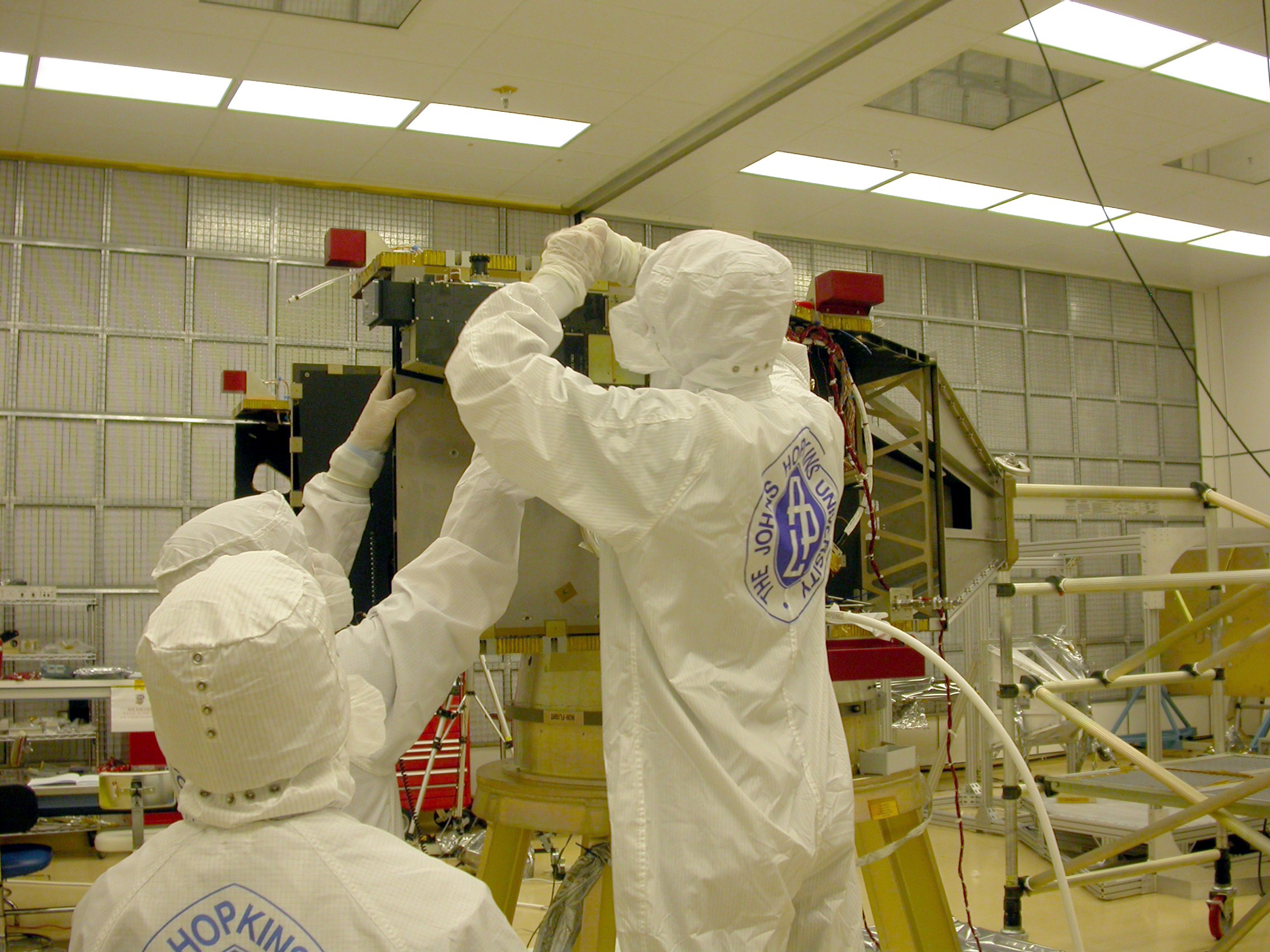
Alice ultraviolet imaging spectrometer on New Horizons

An imaging spectrometer is an instrument used in hyperspectral imaging and imaging spectroscopy to acquire a spectrally-resolved image of an object or scene, usually to support analysis of the composition the object being imaged. The spectral data produced for a pixel is often referred to as a datacube due to the three-dimensional representation of the data. Two axes of the image correspond to vertical and horizontal distance and the third to wavelength. The principle of operation is the same as that of the simple spectrometer, but special care is taken to avoid optical aberrations for better image quality.

Example imaging spectrometer types include: filtered camera, whiskbroom scanner, pushbroom scanner, integral field spectrograph (or related dimensional reformatting techniques), wedge imaging spectrometer, Fourier transform imaging spectrometer, computed tomography imaging spectrometer (CTIS), image replicating imaging spectrometer (IRIS), coded aperture snapshot spectral imager (CASSI), and image mapping spectrometer (IMS).

== Background ==
In 1704, Sir Isaac Newton demonstrated that white light could be split up into component colours. The subsequent history of spectroscopy led to precise measurements and provided the empirical foundations for atomic and molecular physics (Born & Wolf, 1999). Significant achievements in imaging spectroscopy are attributed to airborne instruments, particularly arising in the early 1980s and 1990s (Goetz et al., 1985; Vane et al., 1984). However, it was not until 1999 that the first imaging spectrometer was launched in space (the NASA Moderate-resolution Imaging Spectroradiometer, or MODIS).

Terminology and definitions evolve over time. At one time, >10 spectral bands sufficed to justify the term imaging spectrometer but presently the term is seldom defined by a total minimum number of spectral bands, rather by a contiguous (or redundant) statement of spectral bands.

== Principle ==
Imaging spectrometers are used specifically for the purpose of measuring the spectral content of light and electromagnetic light. The spectral data gathered is used to give the operator insight into the sources of radiation. Prism spectrometers use a classical method of dispersing radiation by means of a prism as a refracting element.

The imaging spectrometer works by imaging a radiation source onto what is called a "slit" by means of a source imager. A collimator collimates the beam that is dispersed by a refracting prism and re-imaged onto a detection system by a re-imager. Special care is taken to produce the best possible image of the source onto the slit. The purpose of the collimator and re-imaging optics are to take the best possible image of the slit. An area-array of elements fills the detection system at this stage. The source image is reimaged, every point, as a line spectrum on what is called a detector-array column. The detector array signals supply data pertaining to spectral content, in particular, spatially resolved source points inside source area. These source points are imaged onto the slit and then re-imaged onto the detector array. Simultaneously, the system provides spectral information about the source area and its line of spatially resolved points. The line is then scanned in order to build a database of information about the spectral content.

In imaging spectroscopy (also hyperspectral imaging or spectral imaging) each pixel of an image acquires many bands of light intensity data from the spectrum, instead of just the three bands of the RGB color model. More precisely, it is the simultaneous acquisition of spatially coregistered images in many spectrally contiguous bands.

Some spectral images contain only a few image planes of a spectral data cube, while others are better thought of as full spectra at every location in the image. For example, solar physicists use the spectroheliograph to make images of the Sun built up by scanning the slit of a spectrograph, to study the behavior of surface features on the Sun; such a spectroheliogram may have a spectral resolution of over 100,000 ($\lambda / \Delta \lambda$) and be used to measure local motion (via the Doppler shift) and even the magnetic field (via the Zeeman splitting or Hanle effect) at each location in the image plane. The multispectral images collected by the Opportunity rover, in contrast, have only four wavelength bands and hence are only a little more than 3-color images.

=== Unmixing ===
Hyperspectral data is often used to determine what materials are present in a scene. Materials of interest could include roadways, vegetation, and specific targets (i.e. pollutants, hazardous materials, etc.). Trivially, each pixel of a hyperspectral image could be compared to a material database to determine the type of material making up the pixel. However, many hyperspectral imaging platforms have low resolution (>5m per pixel) causing each pixel to be a mixture of several materials. The process of unmixing one of these 'mixed' pixels is called hyperspectral image unmixing or simply hyperspectral unmixing.

A solution to hyperspectral unmixing is to reverse the mixing process. Generally, two models of mixing are assumed: linear and nonlinear. Linear mixing models the ground as being flat and incident sunlight on the ground causes the materials to radiate some amount of the incident energy back to the sensor. Each pixel then, is modeled as a linear sum of all the radiated energy curves of materials making up the pixel. Therefore, each material contributes to the sensor's observation in a positive linear fashion. Additionally, a conservation of energy constraint is often observed thereby forcing the weights of the linear mixture to sum to one in addition to being positive. The model can be described mathematically as follows:

$$p = A*x\,$$

where $p$ represents a pixel observed by the sensor, $A$ is a matrix of material reflectance signatures (each signature is a column of the matrix), and $x$ is the proportion of material present in the observed pixel. This type of model is also referred to as a simplex.

With $x$ satisfying the two constraints: 1. Abundance Nonnegativity Constraint (ANC) - each element of x is positive. 2. Abundance Sum-to-one Constraint (ASC) - the elements of x must sum to one.

Non-linear mixing results from multiple scattering often due to non-flat surface such as buildings and vegetation.

There are many algorithms to unmix hyperspectral data each with their own strengths and weaknesses. Many algorithms assume that pure pixels (pixels which contain only one materials) are present in a scene. Some algorithms to perform unmixing are listed below:

- Pixel Purity Index Works by projecting each pixel onto one vector from a set of random vectors spanning the reflectance space. A pixel receives a score when it represent an extremum of all the projections. Pixels with the highest scores are deemed to be spectrally pure.
- N-FINDR
- Gift Wrapping Algorithm
- Independent Component Analysis Endmember Extraction Algorithm - works by assuming that pure pixels occur independently than mixed pixels. Assumes pure pixels are present.
- Vertex Component Analysis - works on the fact that the affine transformation of a simplex is another simplex which helps to find hidden (folded) vertices of the simplex. Assumes pure pixels are present.
- Principal component analysis - could also be used to determine endmembers, projection on principal axes could permit endmember selection [Smith, Johnson et Adams (1985), Bateson et Curtiss (1996)]
- Multi endmembers spatial mixture analysis based on the SMA algorithm
- Spectral phasor analysis based on Fourier transformation of spectra and plotting them on a 2D plot.

Non-linear unmixing algorithms also exist: support vector machines or analytical neural network.

Probabilistic methods have also been attempted to unmix pixel through Monte Carlo unmixing algorithm.

Once the fundamental materials of a scene are determined, it is often useful to construct an abundance map of each material which displays the fractional amount of material present at each pixel. Often linear programming is done to observed ANC and ASC.

== Applications ==
=== Planetary observations ===
The practical application of imaging spectrometers is they are used to observe the planet Earth from orbiting satellites. The spectrometer functions by recording all points of color on a picture, thus, the spectrometer is focused on specific parts of the Earth's surface to record data. The advantages of spectral content data include vegetation identification, physical condition analysis, mineral identification for the purpose of potential mining, and the assessment of polluted waters in oceans, coastal zones and inland waterways.

Prism spectrometers are ideal for Earth observation because they measure wide spectral ranges competently. Spectrometers can be set to cover a range from 400 nm to 2,500 nm, which interests scientists who are able to observe Earth by means of aircraft and satellite. The spectral resolution of the prism spectrometer is not desirable for most scientific applications; thus, its purpose is specific to recording spectral content of areas with greater spatial variations.

Venus Express, orbiting Venus, had a number of imaging spectrometers covering NIR-vis-UV.

=== Geophysical imaging ===
One application is spectral geophysical imaging, which allows quantitative and qualitative characterization of the surface and of the atmosphere, using radiometric measurements. These measurements can then be used for unambiguous direct and indirect identification of surface materials and atmospheric trace gases, the measurement of their relative concentrations, subsequently the assignment of the proportional contribution of mixed pixel signals (e.g., the spectral unmixing problem), the derivation of their spatial distribution (mapping problem), and finally their study over time (multi-temporal analysis). The Moon Mineralogy Mapper on Chandrayaan-1 was a geophysical imaging spectrometer.

== Disadvantages ==
The lenses of the prism spectrometer are used for both collimation and re-imaging; however, the imaging spectrometer is limited in its performance by the image quality provided by the collimators and re-imagers. The resolution of the slit image at each wavelength limits spatial resolution; likewise, the resolution of optics across the slit image at each wavelength limits spectral resolution. Moreover, distortion of the slit image at each wavelength can complicate the interpretation of the spectral data.

The refracting lenses used in the imaging spectrometer limit performance by the axial chromatic aberrations of the lens. These chromatic aberrations are bad because they create differences in focus, which prevent good resolution; however, if the range is restricted it is possible to achieve good resolution. Furthermore, chromatic aberrations can be corrected by using two or more refracting materials over the full visible range. It is harder to correct chromatic aberrations over wider spectral ranges without further optical complexity.

== Systems ==
Spectrometers intended for very wide spectral ranges are best if made with all-mirror systems. These particular systems have no chromatic aberrations, and that is why they are preferable. On the other hand, spectrometers with single point or linear array detection systems require simpler mirror systems. Spectrometers using area-array detectors need more complex mirror systems to provide good resolution. It is conceivable that a collimator could be made that would prevent all aberrations; however, this design is expensive because it requires the use of aspherical mirrors.

Smaller two-mirror systems can correct aberrations, but they are not suited for imaging spectrometers. Three mirror systems are compact and correct aberrations as well, but they require at least two asperical components. Systems with more than four mirrors tend to be large and a lot more complex. Catadioptric systems are used in Imagine Spectrometers and are compact, too; however, the collimator or imager will be made up of two curved mirrors and three refracting elements, and thus, the system is very complex.

Optical complexity is unfavorable, however, because effects scatter all optical surfaces and stray reflections. Scattered radiation can interfere with the detector by entering into it and causing errors in recorded spectra. Stray radiation is referred to as stray light. By limiting the total number of surfaces that can contribute to scatter, it limits the introduction of stray light into the equation.

Imaging spectrometers are meant to produce well resolved images. In order for this to occur, imaging spectrometers need to be made with few optical surfaces and have no aspherical optical surfaces.

=== Sensors ===
Planned:

- EnMAP

Current and Past:

- AVIRIS — airborne
- MODIS — on board EOS Terra and Aqua platforms
- MERIS — on board Envisat
- Hyperion — on board Earth Observing-1
- Several commercial manufacturers for laboratory, ground-based, aerial, or industrial imaging spectrographs

== Examples ==
- Ralph (New Horizons), Visible and ultraviolet imaging spectrometer on New Horizons
- Jovian Infrared Auroral Mapper, infrared imaging spectrometer on Juno Jupiter orbiter
- Mapping Imaging Spectrometer for Europa (planned for developmental Europa Clipper spacecraft
- Compact Reconnaissance Imaging Spectrometer for Mars (CRISM), imaging spectrometer in Mars orbit aboard Mars Reconnaissance Orbiter
- Special Sensor Ultraviolet Limb Imager, to observe the earth's ionosphere and thermosphere

== See also ==
- Landsat
- Remote sensing
- Hyperspectral imaging
- Full Spectral Imaging
- List of Earth observation satellites
- Chemical Imaging
- Infrared Microscopy
- Phasor approach to fluorescence lifetime and spectral imaging
- Video spectroscopy

== Further readling ==
- Goetz, A.F.H., Vane, G., Solomon, J.E., & Rock, B.N. (1985) Imaging spectrometry for earth remote sensing. Science, 228, 1147.
- Schaepman, M. (2005) Spectrodirectional Imaging: From Pixels to Processes. Inaugural address, Wageningen University, Wageningen (NL).
- Vane, G., Chrisp, M., Emmark, H., Macenka, S., & Solomon, J. (1984) Airborne Visible Infrared Imaging Spec-trometer (AVIRIS): An Advanced Tool for Earth Remote Sensing. European Space Agency, (Special Publication) ESA SP, 2, 751.
