= Full spectral imaging =

Full spectral imaging (FSI) is a form of imaging spectroscopy and is the successor to hyperspectral imaging. Full spectral imaging was developed to improve the capabilities of remote sensing including Earth remote sensing.

== Data acquisition ==
Whereas hyperspectral imaging acquires data as many contiguous spectral bands, full spectral imaging acquires data as spectral curves. A significant advantage of FSI over hyperspectral imaging is a significant reduction in data rate and volume. FSI extracts and saves only the information that is in the raw data. The information is contained in the shape of the spectral curves. The rate at which data is produced by an FSI system is proportional to the amount of information in the scene/image.

== Applications ==
Full spectral imaging, along with empirical reflectance retrieval and autonomous remote sensing are the components of the new systems for remote sensing and the successor to the Landsat series of satellites of the Landsat program.
