= Laser direct infrared imaging =

Laser direct infrared imaging (LDIR) is an infrared microscopy architecture that utilizes a tunable Quantum Cascade Laser (QCL) as the IR source. This new reflectance-based architecture eliminates coherence artifacts typically associated with QCLs. It also allows the acquisition of large-area, high-definition IR images as well as high signal-to-noise point spectra. Extending this architecture using Attenuated Total Reflectance (ATR) allows the acquisition of high fidelity spectra from features less than 10 μm in size.

The application of LDIR to stain-free biochemical imaging has recently been reported, with the authors citing the speed of LDIR imaging as an advantage over traditional IR imaging architectures.
