= Special Sensor Ultraviolet Limb Imager =

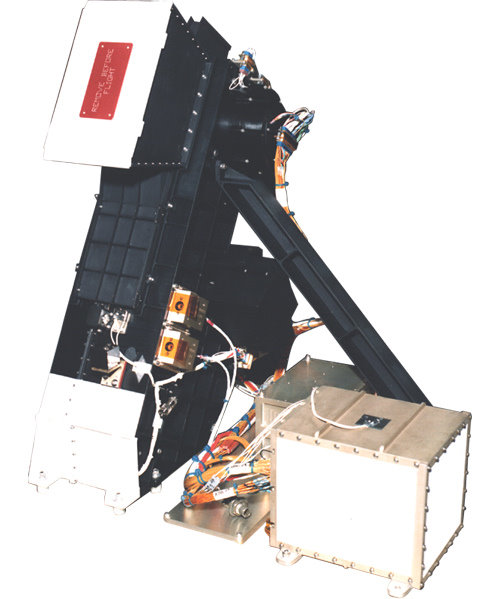
SSULI Components

The Special Sensor Ultraviolet Limb Imager (SSULI) is an imaging spectrometer that is used to observe the earth's ionosphere and thermosphere. These sensors provide vertical intensity profiles of airglow emissions in the extreme ultraviolet and far ultraviolet spectral range of 800 to 1700 Angstrom (80 to 170 nanometre) and scan from 75 km to 750 km tangent altitude. The data from these sensors will be used to infer altitude profiles of ion, electron and neutral density.

The Naval Research Laboratory (NRL) developed five ultraviolet remote sensing instruments for the Air Force Defense Meteorological Satellite Program (DMSP). These instruments known as SSULI (Special Sensor Ultraviolet Limb Imager) launched aboard the DMSP block of 5D3 satellites, which started in 2003. SSULI measures vertical profiles of the natural airglow radiation from atoms, molecules and ions in the upper atmosphere and ionosphere by viewing the Earth's limb at a tangent altitude of approximately 50 km to 750 km.

== Overview ==
The United States Naval Research Laboratory (NRL) built five of these ultraviolet spectrographs for the United States Air Force (USAF) Defense Meteorological Satellite Program (DMSP) block of 5D3 satellites.

== Launch ==
The first sensor was launched on the DMSP F16 spacecraft in October 2003 into a Sun-synchronous 830 km circular orbit at a local time of 0800-2000 UT. Three of the remaining four SSULIs were launched on the following DMSP Block 5D3 satellitesDefense Meteorological Satellite Program#Block 5D:

DMSP F17 - November 4, 2006
DMSP F18 - October 18, 2009
DMSP F19 - April 3, 2014

The last SSULI is at NRL awaiting a new "ride" due to the cancellation and preservation of the last DMSP satellite.

== Mission details ==
Measurements are made from the extreme ultraviolet (EUV) to the far ultraviolet (FUV) over the wavelength range of 80 nanometers to 170 nanometers, with 1.8 nanometer resolution. The satellites will be launched in a near-polar, Sun-synchronous orbit at an altitude of approximately 830 km. The Low Resolution Airglow and Auroral Spectrograph (LORAAS), a SSULI prototype, was launched on board the Advanced Research and Global Observation Satellite (ARGOS_(satellite)) on February 23, 1999. LORAAS data was used to validate SSULI algorithms that convert raw measurements (Figure 2) into useful environmental parameters that characterize the upper atmosphere.

== Software ==
An extensive operational data processing system has been developed to generate environmental data from SSULI spectral data. Spectral data from the LORAAS instrument is also part of this platform. This system, known as the Ground Data Analysis Software (GDAS), includes operational data reduction software using advanced science algorithms also developed at NRL, a customized graphical user interface (GUI), and comprehensive validation techniques. Programs are designed to generate a SSULI Prep file from multiple data sources including Raw Sensor Data Records (RSDR) at the Air Force Weather Agency (AFWA), HIRAAS real-time data assembled at US Space Command, and an extensive HIRAAS infobase on site at the Naval Research Laboratory.

== Technical information ==
The sensor has a field-of-view of 2.4°x0.15° and sweeps out a 2.4°x17° field-of-regard during each 90 second scan, with wavelength coverage between 800Å and 1700Å at 23Å resolution. The field of view scans ahead of the spacecraft in the orbital plane through a 17° field of regard, corresponding to approximately 75–750 km altitude.
