= Focal-plane array testing =

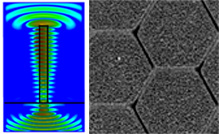
A 2D nanowire array; light field in a nanolaser. Used to create a multi-color focal plane array.

Focal plane array testing is a specialized field of test engineering. Focal plane array (FPA) imaging devices are used in missile guidance sensors, infrared astronomy, manufacturing inspection, and thermal imaging. Focal plane array testing is the process of verifying and validating that these devices function correctly. Focal plane arrays are complex to develop, in some cases the fabrication process may have more than 150 steps, testing of these devices must ensure that each step has the desired result.

The actual test methodology used for testing focal plane arrays differs depending on the type of device. However, the types of tests usually fall into one of the following categories: diagnostic, performance, statistical, system simulation, or end-to-end simulation.

== Government oversight of testing ==
The development and testing military technology such as FPAs is concentrated in the space and defense industries. As a result of this Congress, in 1983, established the Office of the Director of Operational Test and Evaluation (DOT&E) to coordinate, monitor, and evaluate operational testing of major weapon systems. A DOT&E report states this more directly: "The military services need confidence that their systems will not fail during mission execution..."

As part of the Office of the Secretary of Defense, DOT&E is separate from acquisition (that also conducts developmental and operational testing) and therefore is in a position to provide the Secretary and Congress with an independent view. Congress created DOT&E in response to reports of conflicts of interest in the acquisition community's oversight of operational testing leading to inadequate testing of operational suitability and effectiveness and the fielding of new systems that performed poorly.
