= Multispectral imaging =

Capturing image data across multiple electromagnetic spectrum ranges

Video by SDO simultaneously showing sections of the Sun at various wavelengths

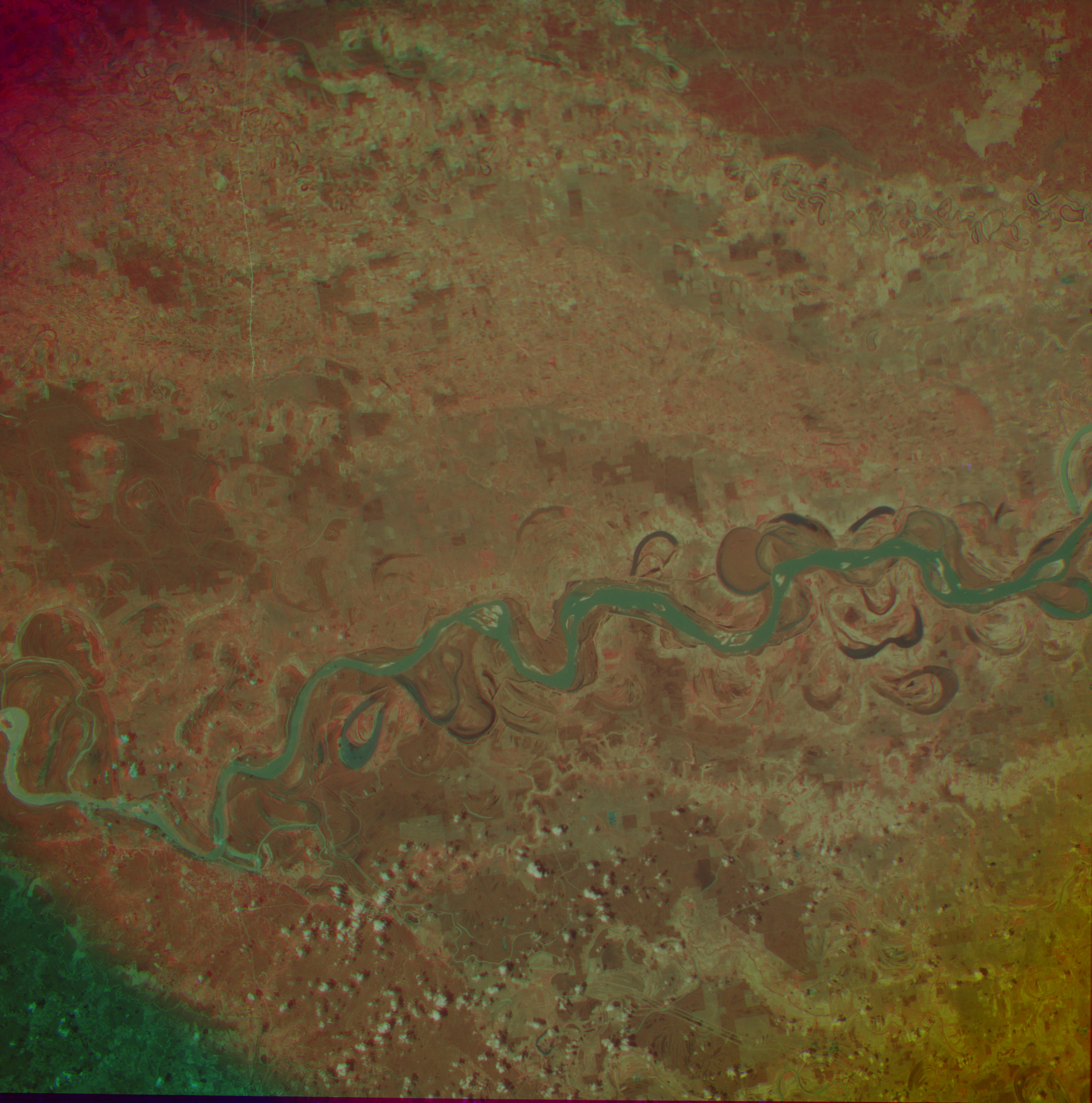
Multispectral image of part of the Mississippi River obtained by combining three images acquired at different nominal wavelengths (800 nm/infrared, 645 nm/red, and 525 nm/green) by Apollo 9 in 1969

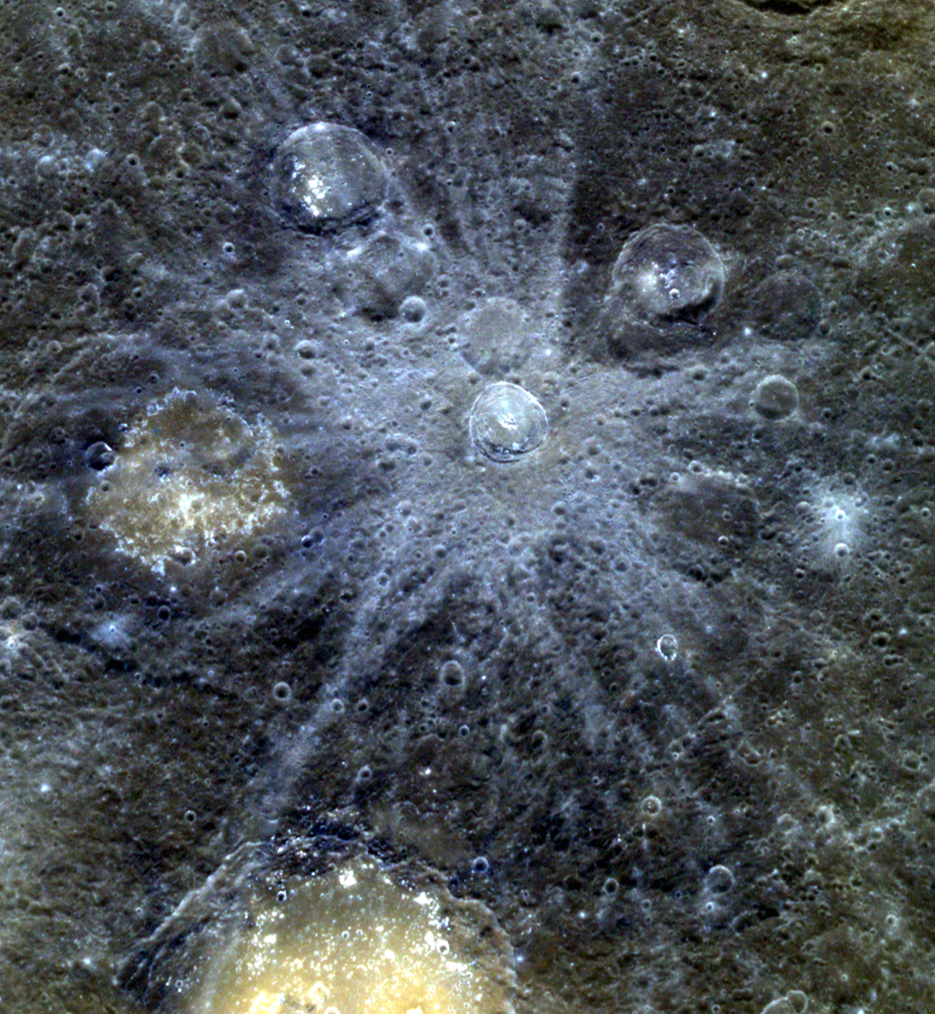
Multispectral image of Bek crater and its ray system on the surface of Mercury, acquired by MESSENGER, combining images at wavelengths of 996, 748, 433 nm. The bright yellow patches in other parts of the image are hollows.

Multispectral imaging captures image data within specific wavelength ranges across the electromagnetic spectrum. The wavelengths may be separated by filters or detected with the use of instruments that are sensitive to particular wavelengths, including light from frequencies beyond the visible light range (i.e. infrared and ultraviolet). It can allow extraction of additional information the human eye fails to capture with its visible receptors for red, green and blue. It was originally developed for military target identification and reconnaissance. Early space-based imaging platforms incorporated multispectral imaging technology to map details of the Earth related to coastal boundaries, vegetation, and landforms. Multispectral imaging has also found use in document and painting analysis.

Multispectral imaging measures light in a small number (typically 3 to 15) of spectral bands. Hyperspectral imaging is a special case of spectral imaging where often hundreds of contiguous spectral bands are available.

== Spectral band usage ==
For different purposes, different combinations of spectral bands can be used. They are usually represented with red, green, and blue channels. Mapping of bands to colors depends on the purpose of the image and the personal preferences of the analysts. Thermal infrared is often omitted from consideration due to poor spatial resolution, except for special purposes.

- True-color uses only red, green, and blue channels, mapped to their respective colors. As a plain color photograph, it is good for analyzing man-made objects, and is easy to understand for beginner analysts.
- Green–red–infrared, where the blue channel is replaced with near infrared, is used for vegetation, which is highly reflective in near IR; it then shows as blue. This combination is often used to detect vegetation and camouflage.
- Blue–NIR–MIR, where the blue channel uses visible blue, green uses NIR (so vegetation stays green), and MIR is shown as red. Such images allow the water depth, vegetation coverage, soil moisture content, and the presence of fires to be seen, all in a single image.

Many other combinations are in use. NIR is often shown as red, causing vegetation-covered areas to appear red.

=== Typical spectral bands ===
The wavelengths are approximate; exact values depend on the particular instruments (e.g. characteristics of satellite's sensors for Earth observation, characteristics of illumination and sensors for document analysis):

- Blue, 450–515/520 nm, is used for atmosphere and deep water imaging, and can reach depths up to 150 feet (50 m) in clear water.
- Green, 515/520–590/600 nm, is used for imaging vegetation and deep water structures, up to 90 feet (30 m) in clear water.
- Red, 600/630–680/690 nm, is used for imaging man-made objects, in water up to 30 feet (9 m) deep, soil, and vegetation.
- Near infrared (NIR), 750–900 nm, is used primarily for imaging vegetation.
- Mid-infrared (MIR), 1550–1750 nm, is used for imaging vegetation, soil moisture content, and some forest fires.
- Far-infrared (FIR), 2080–2350 nm, is used for imaging soil, moisture, geological features, silicates, clays, and fires.
- Thermal infrared, 10,400–12,500 nm, uses emitted instead of reflected radiation to image geological structures, thermal differences in water currents, fires, and for night studies.
- Radar and related technologies are useful for mapping terrain and for detecting various objects.

== Classification ==
Unlike other aerial photographic and satellite image interpretation work, these multispectral images do not make it easy to identify directly the feature type by visual inspection. Hence the remote sensing data has to be classified first, followed by processing by various data enhancement techniques so as to help the user to understand the features that are present in the image.

Such classification is a complex task which involves rigorous validation of the training samples depending on the classification algorithm used. The techniques can be grouped mainly into two types:

- Supervised classification techniques
- Unsupervised classification techniques

Supervised classification makes use of training samples. Training samples are areas on the ground for which there is ground truth, that is, what is there is known. The spectral signatures of the training areas are used to search for similar signatures in the remaining pixels of the image, and we will classify accordingly. This use of training samples for classification is called supervised classification. Expert knowledge is very important in this method since the selection of the training samples and a biased selection can badly affect the accuracy of classification. Popular techniques include the maximum likelihood principle and convolutional neural network. The maximum likelihood principle calculates the probability of a pixel belonging to a class (i.e. feature) and allots the pixel to its most probable class. Newer convolutional neural network based methods account for both spatial proximity and entire spectra to determine the most likely class.

In case of unsupervised classification no prior knowledge is required for classifying the features of the image. The natural clustering or grouping of the pixel values (i.e. the gray levels of the pixels) are observed. Then a threshold is defined for adopting the number of classes in the image. The finer the threshold value, the more classes there will be. However, beyond a certain limit the same class will be represented in different classes in the sense that variation in the class is represented. After forming the clusters, ground truth validation is done to identify the class the image pixel belongs to. Thus in this unsupervised classification a priori information about the classes is not required. One of the popular methods in unsupervised classification is k-means clustering.

=== Data analysis software ===
- MicroMSI is endorsed by the NGA.
- Opticks is an open-source remote sensing application.
- Multispec is freeware multispectral analysis software.
- Gerbil is open source multispectral visualization and analysis software.

== Applications ==
=== Military target tracking ===
Multispectral imaging measures light emission and is often used in detecting or tracking military targets. In 2003, researchers at the United States Army Research Laboratory and the Federal Laboratory Collaborative Technology Alliance reported a dual band multispectral imaging focal plane array (FPA). This FPA allowed researchers to look at two infrared (IR) planes at the same time. Because mid-wave infrared (MWIR) and long wave infrared (LWIR) technologies measure radiation inherent to the object and require no external light source, they also are referred to as thermal imaging methods.

The brightness of the image produced by a thermal imager depends on the objects emissivity and temperature. Every material has an infrared signature that aids in the identification of the object. These signatures are less pronounced in hyperspectral systems (which image in many more bands than multispectral systems) and when exposed to wind and, more dramatically, to rain. Sometimes the surface of the target may reflect infrared energy. This reflection may misconstrue the true reading of the objects' inherent radiation. Imaging systems that use MWIR technology function better with solar reflections on the target's surface and produce more definitive images of hot objects, such as engines, compared to LWIR technology. However, LWIR operates better in hazy environments like smoke or fog because less scattering occurs in the longer wavelengths. Researchers claim that dual-band technologies combine these advantages to provide more information from an image, particularly in the realm of target tracking.

For nighttime target detection, thermal imaging outperformed single-band multispectral imaging. Dual band MWIR and LWIR technology resulted in better visualization during the nighttime than MWIR alone. Citation Citation. The US Army reports that its dual band LWIR/MWIR FPA demonstrated better visualizing of tactical vehicles than MWIR alone after tracking them through both day and night.

==== Land mine detection ====
By analyzing the emissivity of ground surfaces, multispectral imaging can detect the presence of underground missiles. Surface and sub-surface soil possess different physical and chemical properties that appear in spectral analysis. Disturbed soil has increased emissivity in the wavelength range of 8.5 to 9.5 micrometers while demonstrating no change in wavelengths greater than 10 micrometers. The US Army Research Laboratory's dual MWIR/LWIR FPA used "red" and "blue" detectors to search for areas with enhanced emissivity. The red detector acts as a backdrop, verifying realms of undisturbed soil areas, as it is sensitive to the 10.4 micrometer wavelength. The blue detector is sensitive to wavelengths of 9.3 micrometers. If the intensity of the blue image changes when scanning, that region is likely disturbed. The scientists reported that fusing these two images increased detection capabilities.

==== Ballistic missile detection ====
Intercepting an intercontinental ballistic missile (ICBM) in its boost phase requires imaging of the hard body as well as the rocket plumes. MWIR presents a strong signal from highly heated objects including rocket plumes, while LWIR produces emissions from the missile's body material. The US Army Research Laboratory reported that with their dual-band MWIR/LWIR technology, tracking of the Atlas 5 Evolved Expendable Launch Vehicles, similar in design to ICBMs, picked up both the missile body and plumage.

=== Space-based imaging ===
Most radiometers for remote sensing (RS) acquire multispectral images. Dividing the spectrum into many bands, multispectral is the opposite of panchromatic, which records only the total intensity of radiation falling on each pixel. Usually, Earth observation satellites have three or more radiometers. Each acquires one digital image (in remote sensing, called a 'scene') in a small spectral band. The bands are grouped into wavelength regions based on the origin of the light and the interests of the researchers.

=== Weather forecasting ===
Modern weather satellites produce imagery in a variety of spectra.

Multispectral imaging combines two to five spectral imaging bands of relatively large bandwidth into a single optical system. A multispectral system usually provides a combination of visible (0.4 to 0.7 µm), near infrared (NIR; 0.7 to 1 µm), short-wave infrared (SWIR; 1 to 1.7 µm), mid-wave infrared (MWIR; 3.5 to 5 µm) or long-wave infrared (LWIR; 8 to 12 µm) bands into a single system. — Valerie C. Coffey

In the case of Landsat satellites, several different band designations have been used, with as many as 11 bands (Landsat 8) comprising a multispectral image. Spectral imaging with a higher radiometric resolution (involving hundreds or thousands of bands), finer spectral resolution (involving smaller bands), or wider spectral coverage may be called hyperspectral or ultraspectral.

=== Documents and artworks ===
Multispectral imaging can be employed for investigation of paintings and other works of art. The painting is irradiated by ultraviolet, visible and infrared rays and the reflected radiation is recorded in a camera sensitive in this region of the spectrum. The image can also be registered using the transmitted instead of reflected radiation. In special cases the painting can be irradiated by UV, VIS or IR rays and the fluorescence of pigments or varnishes can be registered.

Multispectral analysis has assisted in the interpretation of ancient papyri, such as those found at Herculaneum, by imaging the fragments in the infrared range (1000 nm). Often, the text on the documents appears to the naked eye as black ink on black paper. At 1000 nm, the difference in how paper and ink reflect infrared light makes the text clearly readable. It has also been used to image the Archimedes palimpsest by imaging the parchment leaves in bandwidths from 365–870 nm, and then using advanced digital image processing techniques to reveal the undertext with Archimedes' work. Multispectral imaging has been used in a Mellon Foundation project at Yale University to compare inks in medieval English manuscripts.

Multispectral imaging has also been used to examine discolorations and stains on old books and manuscripts. Comparing the "spectral fingerprint" of a stain to the characteristics of known chemical substances can make it possible to identify the stain. This technique has been used to examine medical and alchemical texts, seeking hints about the activities of early chemists and the possible chemical substances they may have used in their experiments. Like a cook spilling flour or vinegar on a cookbook, an early chemist might have left tangible evidence on the pages of the ingredients used to make medicines.

== See also ==
- Hyperspectral imaging
- Imaging spectrometer
- Imaging spectroscopy
- Liquid crystal tunable filter
- Multispectral pattern recognition
- Normalized difference vegetation index (NDVI)
- Pansharpening
- Reconnaissance satellite
- Remote sensing
- Satellite imagery
