= Spectral imaging =

Branch of spectroscopy and of photography

Spectral imaging is imaging that uses multiple bands across the electromagnetic spectrum. While an ordinary camera captures light across three wavelength bands in the visible spectrum, red, green, and blue (RGB), spectral imaging encompasses a wide variety of techniques that go beyond RGB. Spectral imaging may use the infrared, the visible spectrum, the ultraviolet, x-rays, or some combination of the above. It may include the acquisition of image data in visible and non-visible bands simultaneously, illumination from outside the visible range, or the use of optical filters to capture a specific spectral range. It is also possible to capture hundreds of wavelength bands for each pixel in an image. Although spectral imaging is often treated as a surface-analysis technique, it can also probe beneath the surface, with information depth depending on the spectral range and sample properties.

Multispectral imaging captures a small number of spectral bands, typically three to fifteen, through the use of varying filters and illumination. Many off-the-shelf RGB camera sensors can detect wavelengths of light from 300 nm to 1200 nm. A scene may be illuminated with NIR light, and, simultaneously, an infrared-passing filter may be used on the camera to ensure that visible light is blocked and only NIR is captured in the image. Industrial, military, and scientific work, however, uses sensors built for the purpose.

Hyperspectral imaging is another subcategory of spectral imaging, which combines spectroscopy and digital photography. In hyperspectral imaging, a complete spectrum or some spectral information (such as the Doppler shift or Zeeman splitting of a spectral line) is collected at every pixel in an image plane. A hyperspectral camera uses special hardware to capture hundreds of wavelength bands for each pixel, which can be interpreted as a complete spectrum. In other words, the camera has a high spectral resolution. The phrase "spectral imaging" is sometimes used as a shorthand way of referring to this technique, but it is preferable to use the term "hyperspectral imaging" in places when ambiguity may arise. Hyperspectral images are often represented as an image cube, which is type of data cube.

Applications of spectral imaging include art conservation, astronomy, solar physics, planetology, and Earth remote sensing. It also applies to digital and print reproduction, and exhibition lighting design for small and medium cultural institutions.

== Systems ==
Spectral imaging systems are the systems that through the acquisition of one or more images of a subject are able of giving back a spectrum for each pixel of the original images.

There are a number of parameters to characterize the obtained data:

- Spatial resolution, which can be described in terms of number of pixels for the whole image, or in terms of minimum square area distinguishable on the surface. Typically it depends on the number of mega pixels of the photographic camera
- Spectral resolution, that define the smallest spectral variation that the system is able of distinguish
- Radiometric accuracy, that says how accurate is the system in measuring the spectral reflectance percentage

The most used way to achieve spectral imaging is to take an image for each desired band, using narrowband filters. This leads to a huge number of images and large bank of filters when a significant spectral resolution is required.

There is another technique, much more efficient and based on multibandpass filters, which allows obtaining a number of final bands starting from a limited number of images. The taken images build a mathematical base with enough information to reconstruct data for each pixel with a high spectral resolution. This is the approach followed by the Hypercolorimetric Multispectral Imaging (HMI) of Profilocolore SRL.

== See also ==
- Imaging spectroscopy
- Chemical imaging
- Dopplergraph
- Imaging spectrometer
- Vegetation index
