= Hyperspectral imaging =

Multi-wavelength imaging method

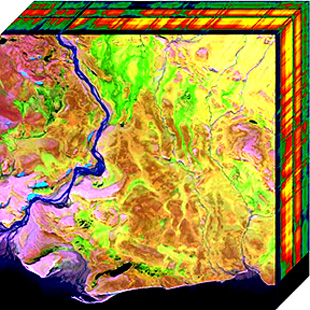
Two-dimensional projection of a hyperspectral cube.

Hyperspectral imaging collects and processes information from across the electromagnetic spectrum. The goal of hyperspectral imaging is to obtain the spectrum for each pixel in the image of a scene, with the purpose of finding objects, identifying materials, or detecting processes. There are three general types of spectral imagers. There are push broom scanners and the related whisk broom scanners (spatial scanning), which read images over time, band sequential scanners (spectral scanning), which acquire images of an area at different wavelengths, and snapshot hyperspectral imagers, which uses a staring array to generate an image in an instant.

Whereas the human eye sees color of visible light in mostly three bands (long wavelengths, perceived as red; medium wavelengths, perceived as green; and short wavelengths, perceived as blue), spectral imaging divides the spectrum into many more bands. This technique of dividing images into bands can be extended beyond the visible. In hyperspectral imaging, the recorded spectra have fine wavelength resolution and cover a wide range of wavelengths. Hyperspectral imaging measures continuous spectral bands, as opposed to multiband imaging which measures spaced spectral bands.

Although hyperspectral imaging is often treated as a surface-analysis technique, it can also probe beneath the surface, with information depth depending on the spectral range and sample properties.

Engineers build hyperspectral sensors and processing systems for applications in astronomy, agriculture, molecular biology, biomedical imaging, geosciences, physics, and surveillance. Hyperspectral sensors look at objects using a vast portion of the electromagnetic spectrum. Certain objects leave unique "fingerprints" in the electromagnetic spectrum. Known as spectral signatures, these "fingerprints" enable identification of the materials that make up a scanned object. For example, a spectral signature for oil helps geologists find new oil fields.

== Sensors ==
Figuratively speaking, hyperspectral sensors collect information as a set of "images." Each image represents a narrow wavelength range of the electromagnetic spectrum, also known as a spectral band. These "images" are combined to form a three-dimensional (x, y, λ) hyperspectral data cube for processing and analysis, where x and y represent two spatial dimensions of the scene, and λ represents the spectral dimension (comprising a range of wavelengths).

Technically speaking, there are four ways for sensors to sample the hyperspectral cube: spatial scanning, spectral scanning, snapshot imaging, and spatio-spectral scanning.

Hyperspectral cubes are generated from airborne sensors like NASA's Airborne Visible/Infrared Imaging Spectrometer (AVIRIS), or from satellites like NASA's EO-1 with its hyperspectral instrument Hyperion. However, for many development and validation studies, handheld sensors are used.

The precision of these sensors is typically measured in spectral resolution, which is the width of each band of the spectrum that is captured. If the scanner detects a large number of fairly narrow frequency bands, it is possible to identify objects even if they are only captured in a handful of pixels. However, spatial resolution is a factor in addition to spectral resolution. If the pixels are too large, then multiple objects are captured in the same pixel and become difficult to identify. If the pixels are too small, then the intensity captured by each sensor cell is low, and the decreased signal-to-noise ratio reduces the reliability of measured features.

The acquisition and processing of hyperspectral images is also referred to as imaging spectroscopy or, with reference to the hyperspectral cube, as 3D spectroscopy.

== Scanning techniques ==
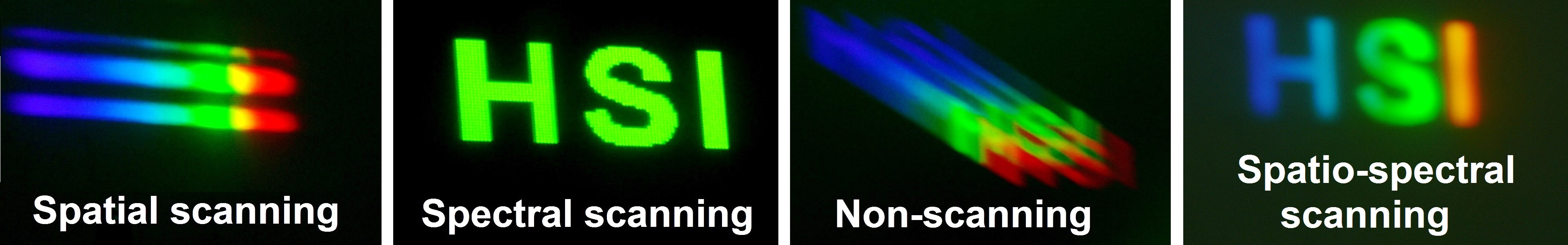
Photos illustrating individual sensor outputs for the four hyperspectral imaging techniques. From left to right: Slit spectrum; monochromatic spatial map; 'perspective projection' of hyperspectral cube; wavelength-coded spatial map.

There are four basic techniques for acquiring the three-dimensional (x, y, λ) dataset of a hyperspectral cube. The choice of technique depends on the specific application, seeing that each technique has context-dependent advantages and disadvantages.

=== Spatial scanning ===
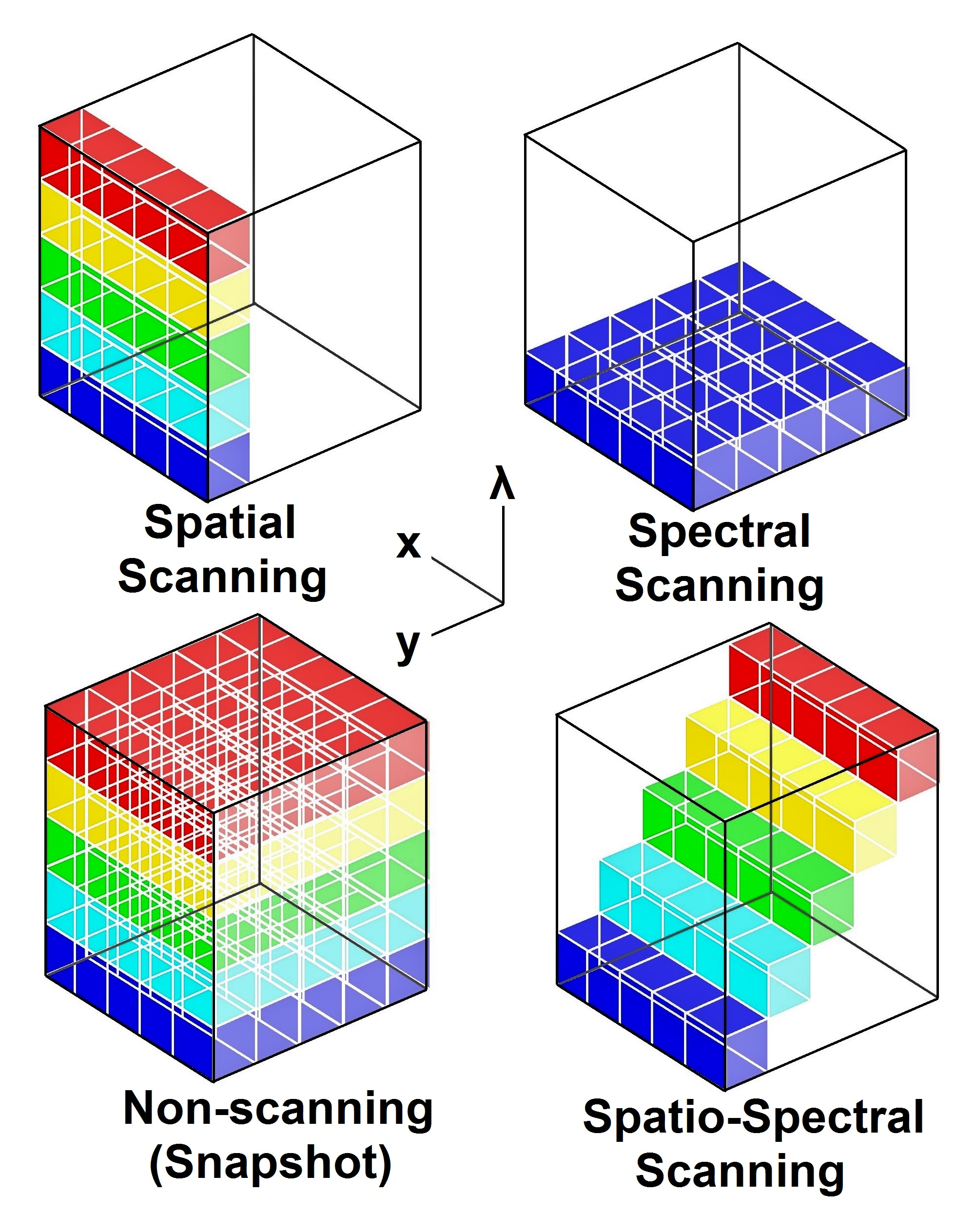
Acquisition techniques for hyperspectral imaging, visualized as sections of the hyperspectral datacube with its two spatial dimensions (x, y) and one spectral dimension (λ).

In spatial scanning, each two-dimensional (2D) sensor output represents a full slit spectrum (x, λ). Hyperspectral imaging (HSI) devices for spatial scanning obtain slit spectra by projecting a strip of the scene onto a slit and dispersing the slit image with a prism or a grating. These systems have the drawback of having the image analyzed per lines (with a push broom scanner) and also having some mechanical parts integrated into the optical train. With these line-scan cameras, the spatial dimension is collected through platform movement or scanning. This requires stabilized mounts or accurate pointing information to 'reconstruct' the image. Nonetheless, line-scan systems are particularly common in remote sensing, where it is sensible to use mobile platforms. Line-scan systems are also used to scan materials moving by on a conveyor belt. A special case of line scanning is point scanning (with a whisk broom scanner), where a point-like aperture is used instead of a slit, and the sensor is essentially one-dimensional instead of 2D.

=== Spectral scanning ===
In spectral scanning, each 2D sensor output represents a monochromatic (i.e. single wavelength), spatial (x, y)-map of the scene. HSI devices for spectral scanning are typically based on optical band-pass filters (either tunable or fixed). The scene is spectrally scanned by exchanging one filter after another while the platform remains stationary. In such "staring", wavelength scanning systems, spectral smearing can occur if there is movement within the scene, invalidating spectral correlation/detection. Nonetheless, there is the advantage of being able to pick and choose spectral bands, and having a direct representation of the two spatial dimensions of the scene. If the imaging system is used on a moving platform, such as an airplane, acquired images at different wavelengths corresponds to different areas of the scene. The spatial features on each of the images may be used to realign the pixels.

=== Non-scanning ===
In non-scanning, a single 2D sensor output contains all spatial (x, y) and spectral (λ) data. HSI devices for non-scanning yield the full datacube at once, without any scanning. Figuratively speaking, a single snapshot represents a perspective projection of the datacube, from which its three-dimensional structure can be reconstructed. The most prominent benefits of these snapshot hyperspectral imaging systems are the snapshot advantage (higher light throughput) and shorter acquisition time. A number of systems have been designed, including computed tomographic imaging spectrometry (CTIS), fiber-reformatting imaging spectrometry (FRIS), integral field spectroscopy with lenslet arrays (IFS-L), multi-aperture integral field spectrometer (Hyperpixel Array), integral field spectroscopy with image slicing mirrors (IFS-S), image-replicating imaging spectrometry (IRIS), filter stack spectral decomposition (FSSD), coded aperture snapshot spectral imaging (CASSI), image mapping spectrometry (IMS), and multispectral Sagnac interferometry (MSI). However, computational effort and manufacturing costs are high. In an effort to reduce the computational demands and potentially the high cost of non-scanning hyperspectral instrumentation, prototype devices based on Multivariate Optical Computing have been demonstrated. These devices have been based on the Multivariate Optical Element spectral calculation engine or the Spatial Light Modulator spectral calculation engine. In these platforms, chemical information is calculated in the optical domain prior to imaging such that the chemical image relies on conventional camera systems with no further computing. As a disadvantage of these systems, no spectral information is ever acquired, i.e. only the chemical information, such that post processing or reanalysis is not possible.

=== Spatiospectral scanning ===
In spatiospectral scanning, each 2D sensor output represents a wavelength-coded ("rainbow-colored", λ = λ(y)), spatial (x, y)-map of the scene. A prototype for this technique, introduced in 2014, consists of a camera at some non-zero distance behind a basic slit spectroscope (slit + dispersive element). Advanced spatiospectral scanning systems can be obtained by placing a dispersive element before a spatial scanning system. Scanning can be achieved by moving the whole system relative to the scene, by moving the camera alone, or by moving the slit alone. Spatiospectral scanning unites some advantages of spatial and spectral scanning, thereby alleviating some of their disadvantages.

== Distinguishing hyperspectral from multispectral imaging ==
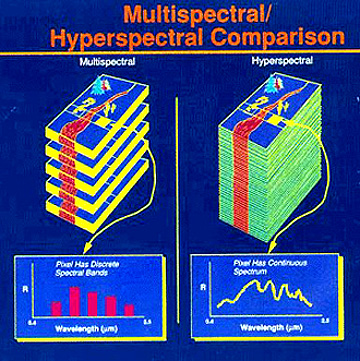
Multispectral and hyperspectral differences.

Hyperspectral imaging is part of a class of techniques commonly referred to as spectral imaging or spectral analysis. The term "hyperspectral imaging" derives from the development of NASA's Airborne Imaging Spectrometer (AIS) and AVIRIS in the mid-1980s. Although NASA prefers the earlier term "imaging spectroscopy" over "hyperspectral imaging," use of the latter term has become more prevalent in scientific and non-scientific language. In a peer reviewed letter, experts recommend using the terms "imaging spectroscopy" or "spectral imaging" and avoiding exaggerated prefixes such as "hyper-," "super-" and "ultra-," to prevent misnomers in discussion.

Hyperspectral imaging is related to multispectral imaging. The distinction between hyper- and multi-band is sometimes based incorrectly on an arbitrary "number of bands" or on the type of measurement. Hyperspectral imaging (HSI) uses continuous and contiguous ranges of wavelengths (e.g. 400 - 1100 nm in steps of 1 nm) whilst multiband imaging (MSI) uses a subset of targeted wavelengths at chosen locations (e.g. 400 - 1100 nm in steps of 20 nm).

Multiband imaging deals with several images at discrete and somewhat narrow bands. Being "discrete and somewhat narrow" is what distinguishes multispectral imaging in the visible wavelength from color photography. A multispectral sensor may have many bands covering the spectrum from the visible to the longwave infrared. Multispectral images do not produce the "spectrum" of an object. Landsat is a prominent practical example of multispectral imaging.

Hyperspectral deals with imaging narrow spectral bands over a continuous spectral range, producing the spectra of all pixels in the scene. A sensor with only 20 bands can also be hyperspectral when it covers the range from 500 to 700 nm with 20 bands each 10 nm wide, while a sensor with 20 discrete bands covering the visible, near, short wave, medium wave and long wave infrared would be considered multispectral.

In addition, some formal standards define HSI using a minimum number of spectral channels. For example, the IEEE 4001 standard for hyperspectral data characterization defines hyperspectral imagery as containing 30 or more spectral bands, primarily for data interoperability, system classification, and metadata standardization.

Ultraspectral could be reserved for interferometer type imaging sensors with a very fine spectral resolution. These sensors often have (but not necessarily) a low spatial resolution of several pixels only, a restriction imposed by the high data rate.

== Applications ==
Hyperspectral remote sensing is used in a wide array of applications. Although originally developed for mining and geology (the ability of hyperspectral imaging to identify various minerals makes it ideal for the mining and oil industries, where it can be used to look for ore and oil), it has now spread into fields as widespread as ecology and surveillance, as well as historical manuscript research, such as the imaging of the Archimedes Palimpsest. This technology is continually becoming more available to the public. Organizations such as NASA and the USGS have catalogues of various minerals and their spectral signatures, and have posted them online to make them readily available for researchers. On a smaller scale, NIR hyperspectral imaging can be used to rapidly monitor the application of pesticides to individual seeds for quality control of the optimum dose and homogeneous coverage.

=== Agriculture ===
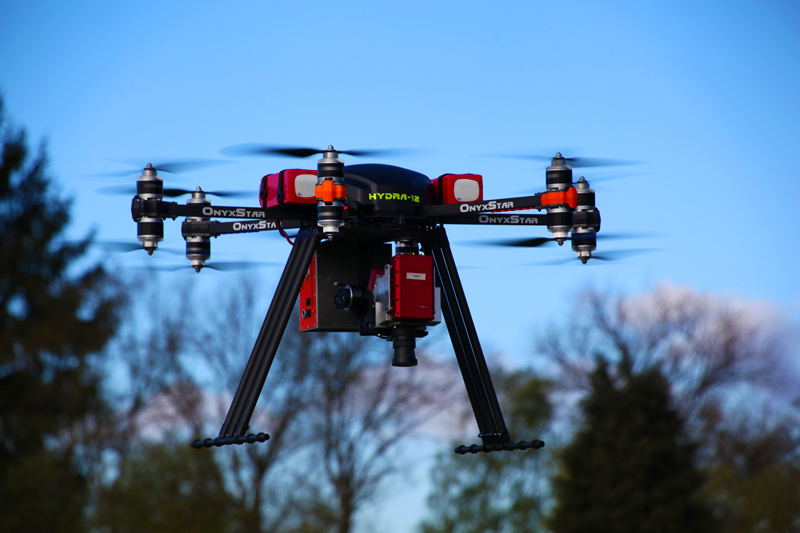
Hyperspectral camera embedded on OnyxStar HYDRA-12 UAV from AltiGator.

Although the cost of acquiring hyperspectral images is typically high for specific crops and in specific climates, hyperspectral remote sensing use is increasing for monitoring the development and health of crops. In Australia, work is under way to use imaging spectrometers to detect grape variety and develop an early warning system for disease outbreaks. Furthermore, work is under way to use hyperspectral data to detect the chemical composition of plants, which can be used to detect the nutrient and water status of wheat in irrigated systems. On a smaller scale, NIR hyperspectral imaging can be used to rapidly monitor the application of pesticides to individual seeds for quality control of the optimum dose and homogeneous coverage.

Another application in agriculture is the detection of animal proteins in compound feeds to avoid bovine spongiform encephalopathy (BSE), also known as mad-cow disease. Different studies have been done to propose alternative tools to the reference method of detection, (classical microscopy). One of the first alternatives is near infrared microscopy (NIR), which combines the advantages of microscopy and NIR. In 2004, the first study relating this problem with hyperspectral imaging was published. Hyperspectral libraries that are representative of the diversity of ingredients usually present in the preparation of compound feeds were constructed. These libraries can be used together with chemometric tools to investigate the limit of detection, specificity and reproducibility of the NIR hyperspectral imaging method for the detection and quantification of animal ingredients in feed.

HSI cameras can also be used to detect stress from heavy metals in plants and become an earlier and faster alternative to post-harvest wet chemical methods.

=== Zoology ===
Hyperspectral imaging is also used in zoology; it is used to investigate the spatial distribution of coloration and its extension into the near-infrared and SWIR range of the spectrum. Some animals for example, such as some tropical frogs and certain leaf-sitting insects are highly reflective in the near-infrared.

=== Waste sorting and recycling ===
Hyperspectral imaging can provide information about the chemical constituents of materials which makes it useful for waste sorting and recycling. It has been applied to distinguish between substances with different fabrics and to identify natural, animal and synthetic fibers. HSI cameras can be integrated with machine vision systems and, via simplifying platforms, allow end-customers to create new waste sorting applications and other sorting/identification applications. A system of machine learning and hyperspectral camera can distinguish between 12 different types of plastics such as PET and PP for automated separation of waste of, as of 2020, highly unstandardized plastics products and packaging.

=== Eye care ===
Researchers at the Université de Montréal are working with Photon etc. and Optina Diagnostics to test the use of hyperspectral photography in the diagnosis of retinopathy and macular edema before damage to the eye occurs. The metabolic hyperspectral camera will detect a drop in oxygen consumption in the retina, which indicates potential disease. An ophthalmologist will then be able to treat the retina with injections to prevent any potential damage.

=== Food processing ===
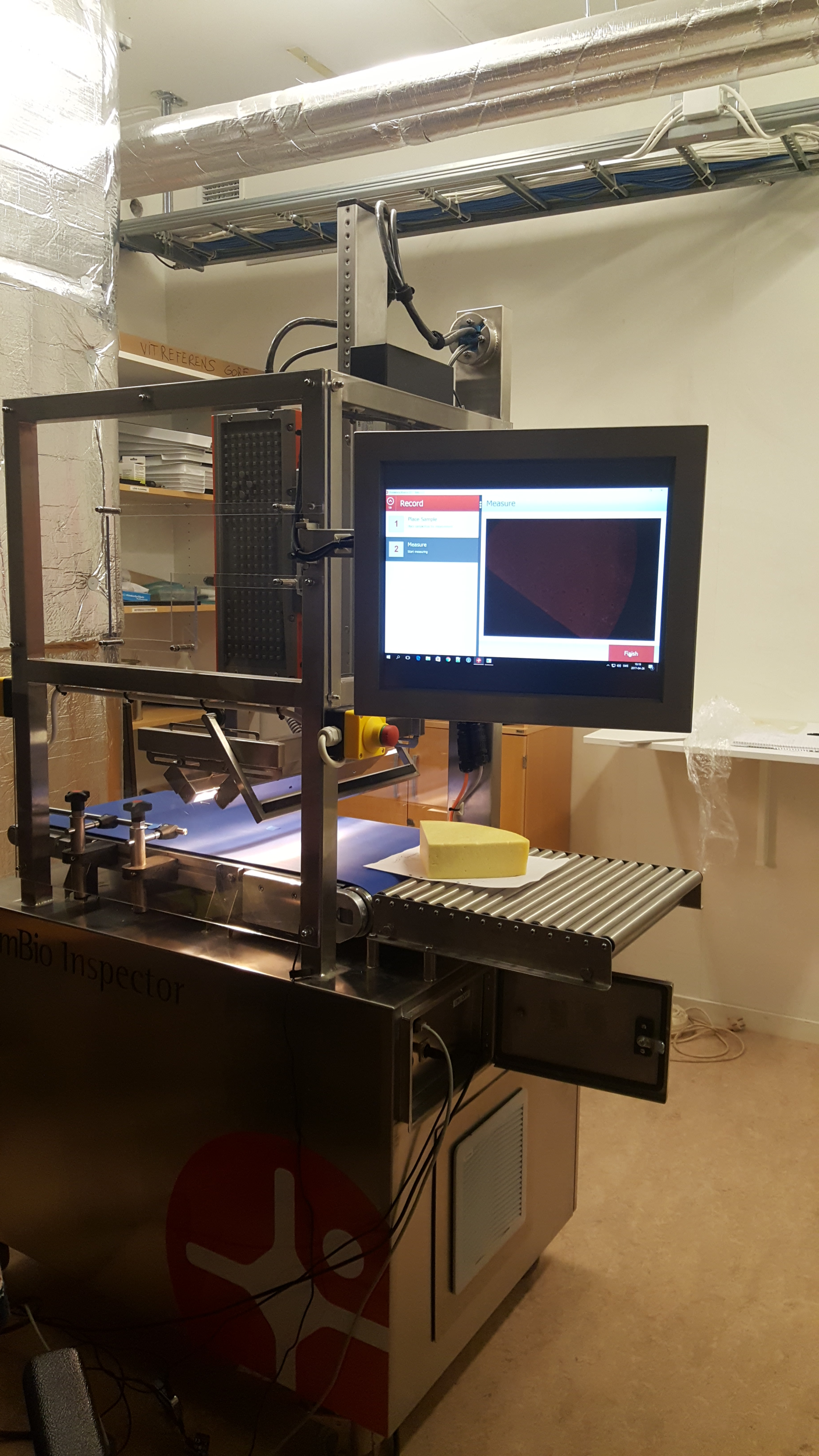
A line scan push-broom system was used to scan the cheeses and images were acquired using a Hg-Cd-Te array (386x288) equipped linescan camera with halogen light as a radiation source.

In the food processing industry, hyperspectral imaging, combined with intelligent software, enables digital sorters (also called optical sorters) to identify and remove defects and foreign material (FM) that are invisible to traditional camera and laser sorters. By improving the accuracy of defect and FM removal, the food processor's objective is to enhance product quality and increase yields.

Adopting hyperspectral imaging on digital sorters achieves non-destructive, 100 percent inspection in-line at full production volumes. The sorter's software compares the hyperspectral images collected to user-defined accept/reject thresholds, and the ejection system automatically removes defects and foreign material.

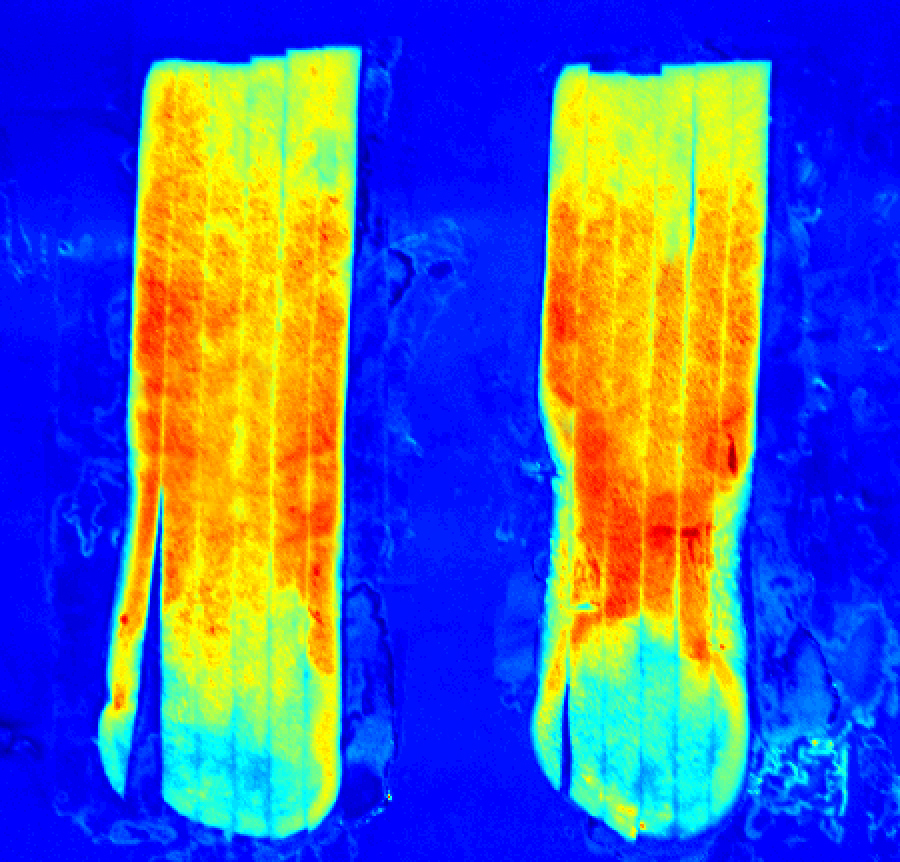
A hyperspectral image of "sugar end" potato strips reveals invisible defects.

The recent commercial adoption of hyperspectral sensor-based food sorters is most advanced in the nut industry where installed systems maximize the removal of stones, shells and other foreign material (FM) and extraneous vegetable matter (EVM) from walnuts, pecans, almonds, pistachios, peanuts and other nuts. Here, improved product quality, low false reject rates and the ability to handle high incoming defect loads often justify the cost of the technology.

Commercial adoption of hyperspectral sorters is also advancing at a fast pace in the potato processing industry where the technology promises to solve a number of product quality problems. Work is under way to use hyperspectral imaging to detect "sugar ends", "hollow heart" and "common scab" , conditions that plague potato processors.

=== Mineralogy ===
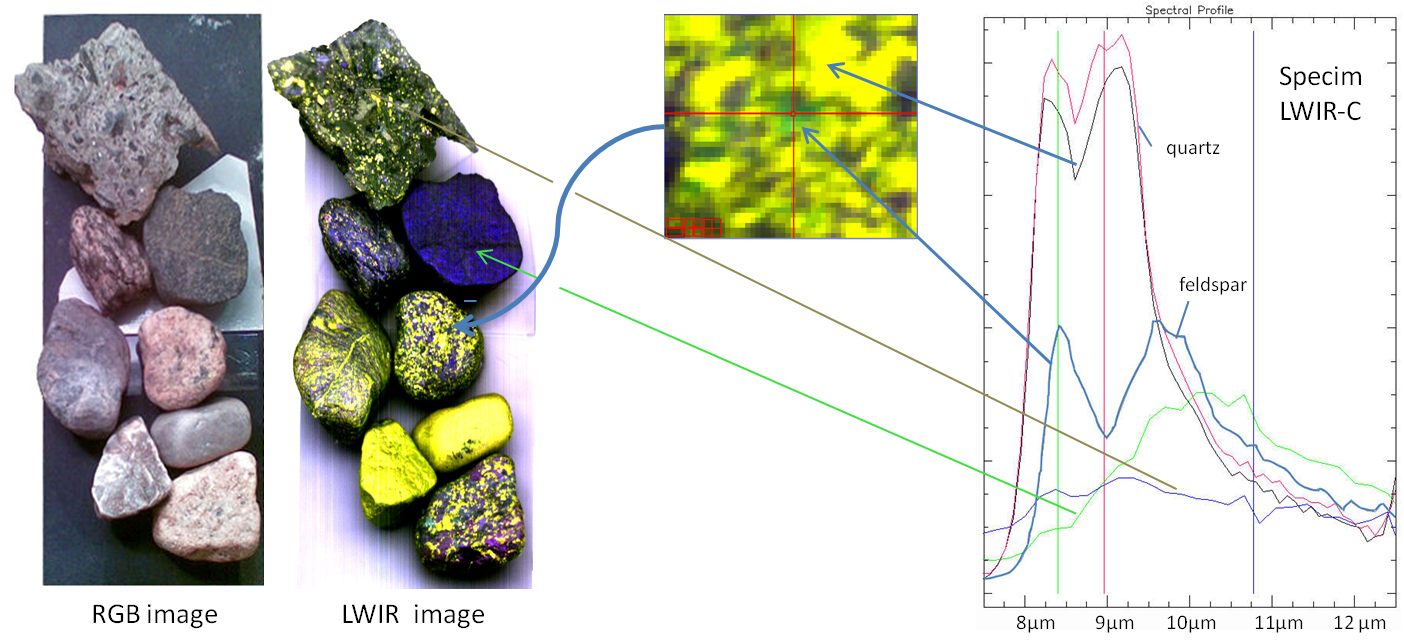
A set of stones is scanned with a Specim LWIR-C imager in the thermal infrared range from 7.7 μm to 12.4 μm. The quartz and feldspar spectra are clearly recognizable.

Geological samples, such as drill cores, can be rapidly mapped for nearly all minerals of commercial interest with hyperspectral imaging. Fusion of SWIR and LWIR spectral imaging is standard for the detection of minerals in the feldspar, silica, calcite, garnet, and olivine groups, as these minerals have their most distinctive and strongest spectral signature in the LWIR regions.

Hyperspectral remote sensing of minerals is well developed. Many minerals can be identified from airborne images, and their relation to the presence of valuable minerals, such as gold and diamonds, is well understood. Currently, progress is towards understanding the relationship between oil and gas leakages from pipelines and natural wells, and their effects on the vegetation and the spectral signatures. Recent work includes the PhD dissertations of Werff and Noomen.

=== Surveillance ===
Hyperspectral thermal infrared emission measurement, an outdoor scan in winter conditions, ambient temperature -15°C—relative radiance spectra from various targets in the image are shown with arrows. The infrared spectra of the different objects such as the watch glass have clearly distinctive characteristics. The contrast level indicates the temperature of the object. This image was produced with a Specim LWIR hyperspectral imager.

Hyperspectral surveillance is the implementation of hyperspectral scanning technology for surveillance purposes. Hyperspectral imaging is particularly useful in military surveillance because of countermeasures that military entities now take to avoid airborne surveillance. The idea that drives hyperspectral surveillance is that hyperspectral scanning draws information from such a large portion of the light spectrum that any given object should have a unique spectral signature in at least a few of the many bands that are scanned. Hyperspectral imaging has also shown potential to be used in facial recognition purposes. Facial recognition algorithms using hyperspectral imaging have been shown to perform better than algorithms using traditional imaging.

Traditionally, commercially available thermal infrared hyperspectral imaging systems have needed liquid nitrogen or helium cooling, which has made them impractical for most surveillance applications. In 2010, Specim introduced a thermal infrared hyperspectral camera that can be used for outdoor surveillance and UAV applications without an external light source such as the sun or the moon.

=== Astronomy ===
In astronomy, hyperspectral imaging is used to determine a spatially resolved spectral image. Since a spectrum is an important diagnostic, having a spectrum for each pixel allows more science cases to be addressed. In astronomy, this technique is commonly referred to as integral field spectroscopy, and examples of this technique include FLAMES and SINFONI on the Very Large Telescope. The Advanced CCD Imaging Spectrometer on the Chandra X-ray Observatory uses this technique.

=== Chemical imaging ===
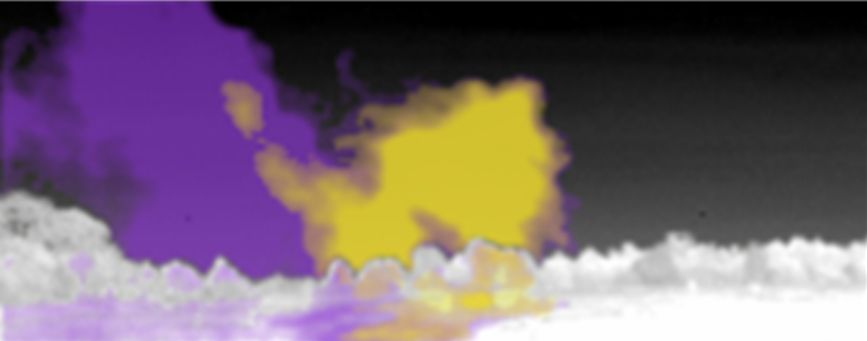
Remote chemical imaging of a simultaneous release of SF_{6} and NH_{3} at 1.5 km using the Telops Hyper-Cam imaging spectrometer.

Soldiers can be exposed to a wide variety of chemical hazards. These threats are mostly invisible but detectable by hyperspectral imaging technology. The Telops Hyper-Cam, introduced in 2005, has demonstrated this at distances up to 5 km.

=== Inkjet print analysis ===
Hyperspectral imaging in the visible near-infrared (VNIR) spectral range can effectively distinguish between dye-based and pigment-based inkjet prints, despite their similar appearance to the naked eye. Research has demonstrated that these two ink types exhibit significantly different spectral characteristics, particularly in the near-infrared band (800-1000 nm), where dye-based inks show substantially higher reflectance compared to pigment-based inks. This difference is especially pronounced for black ink, where pigment-based ink maintains low reflectance across the entire VNIR spectrum while dye-based ink reflectance increases dramatically in the NIR range. Thus, hyperspectral technology may offer practical applications in detecting print forgery, validating archival-quality prints, and potentially identifying specific printer types used to create documents.

=== Environment ===
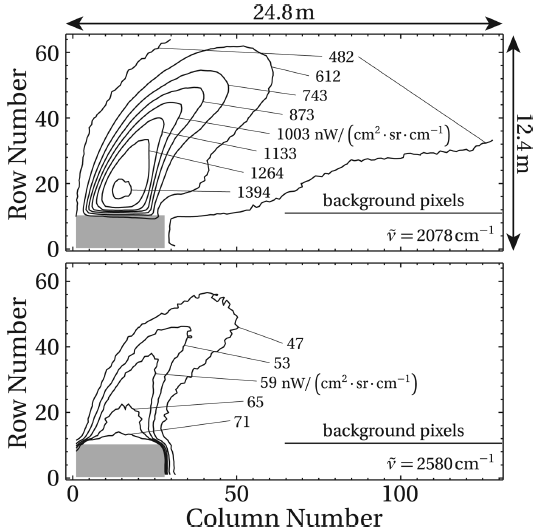
Top panel: Contour map of the time-averaged spectral radiance at 2078 cm^{−1} corresponding to a CO_{2} emission line. Bottom panel: Contour map of the spectral radiance at 2580 cm^{−1} corresponding to continuum emission from particulates in the plume. The translucent gray rectangle indicates the position of the stack. The horizontal line at row 12 between columns 64-128 indicate the pixels used to estimate the background spectrum. Measurements made with the Telops Hyper-Cam.

Most countries require continuous monitoring of emissions produced by coal and oil-fired power plants, municipal and hazardous waste incinerators, cement plants, as well as many other types of industrial sources. This monitoring is usually performed using extractive sampling systems coupled with infrared spectroscopy techniques. Some recent standoff measurements performed allowed the evaluation of the air quality but not many remote independent methods allow for low uncertainty measurements.

=== Civil engineering ===
Recent research indicates that hyperspectral imaging may be useful to detect the development of cracks in pavements which are hard to detect from images taken with visible spectrum cameras.

=== Biomedical imaging ===
Hyperspectral imaging has also been used to detect cancer, identify nerves and analyze bruises. Furthermore, hyperspectral imaging in the visible, near-infrared, and short-wave infrared spectral ranges can identify pathogens in mixed biofilms, such as Staphylococcus aureus and Pseudomonas aeruginosa, which are often found on surfaces in mono-species and polymicrobial biofilms consisting of combinations of different strains.

=== Autonomous vehicles ===
Hyperspectral imaging has recently been explored for use in autonomous driving and advanced driver-assistance systems. It can be used to improve pedestrian separability and object classification compared with conventional RGB cameras, and to help distinguish road conditions such as water or snow on the surface.

== Advantages and disadvantages ==
The primary advantage to hyperspectral imaging is that, because an entire spectrum is acquired at each point, the operator needs no prior knowledge of the sample, and postprocessing allows all available information from the dataset to be mined. Hyperspectral imaging can also take advantage of the spatial relationships among the different spectra in a neighbourhood, allowing more elaborate spectral-spatial models for a more accurate segmentation and classification of the image.

The high cost and complexity of hyperspectral imaging equipment has limited its adoption, and analysis of hyperspectral data requires high computing power, especially for real-time or mobile applications. Significant data storage and transmission capacities are necessary, since hyperspectral cubes are large, multidimensional datasets—for example, NASA's AVIRIS sensor, in use since 1987, produces about 500 megabytes per datacube. Significant research has gone into onboard processing of hyperspectral data in satellites, to reduce transmission sizes by only sending detection results. Increasingly, deep learning is being researched to lower the computational cost of processing hyperspectral data.

== See also ==
- Acousto-optic tunable filter
- Airborne real-time cueing hyperspectral enhanced reconnaissance
- Cathodoluminescence
- Full spectral imaging
- HyMap, a widely used hyperspectral imaging sensor
- Liquid crystal tunable filter
- Metamerism (color), the perceptual equivalence that hyperspectral imaging overcomes
- Multispectral image
- Sensor fusion
- Video spectroscopy
