= Specim =

European technology firm

Specim, Spectral Imaging Ltd Oy
- Type: Limited company, Osakeyhtiö
- Industry: Hyperspectral imaging
- Founded: June 7, 1995
- Headquarters: Oulu, Finland
- Number of locations: Specim locations in Munich, Shanghai and Rome.
- Area served: Worldwide
- Key people: Takayuki Mukai CEO
- Products: Imaging spectrographs, spectral cameras and systems
- Number of employees: Circa 90 (2024)
- Parent: Konica Minolta Group
- Website: https://www.specim.com

Specim, Spectral Imaging Ltd is a European technology firm headquartered in Oulu, Finland. Specim manufactures and sells imaging spectrographs, hyperspectral cameras and systems. Specim's airborne AISA hyperspectral cameras have been utilized for example in monitoring the environmental effects of major industrial catastrophes such as Deepwater Horizon oil spill and Red mud spill.

In 2010, Specim was widely credited for its Thermal Infrared Hyperspectral Cameras, including a position as a Prism Awards for Photonics Innovation finalist. The credited Specim Owl is world's first Thermal Hyperspectral Camera that can efficiently be used for outdoor surveillance and UAV applications without an external light source such as the Sun or the Moon.

In 2013, together with Germany's Forschungszentrum Jülich research centre, Specim developed and thoroughly tested the novel Hyplant airborne hyperspectral sensor. This was the first airborne sensor to map the fluorescence over large areas. Since then it has been used to map various types of vegetation all over Europe and also in the USA. This project is one step in assessing feasibility of possible new ESA satellite instrument that could provide global maps of vegetation fluorescence called the Fluorescence Explorer (FLEX).

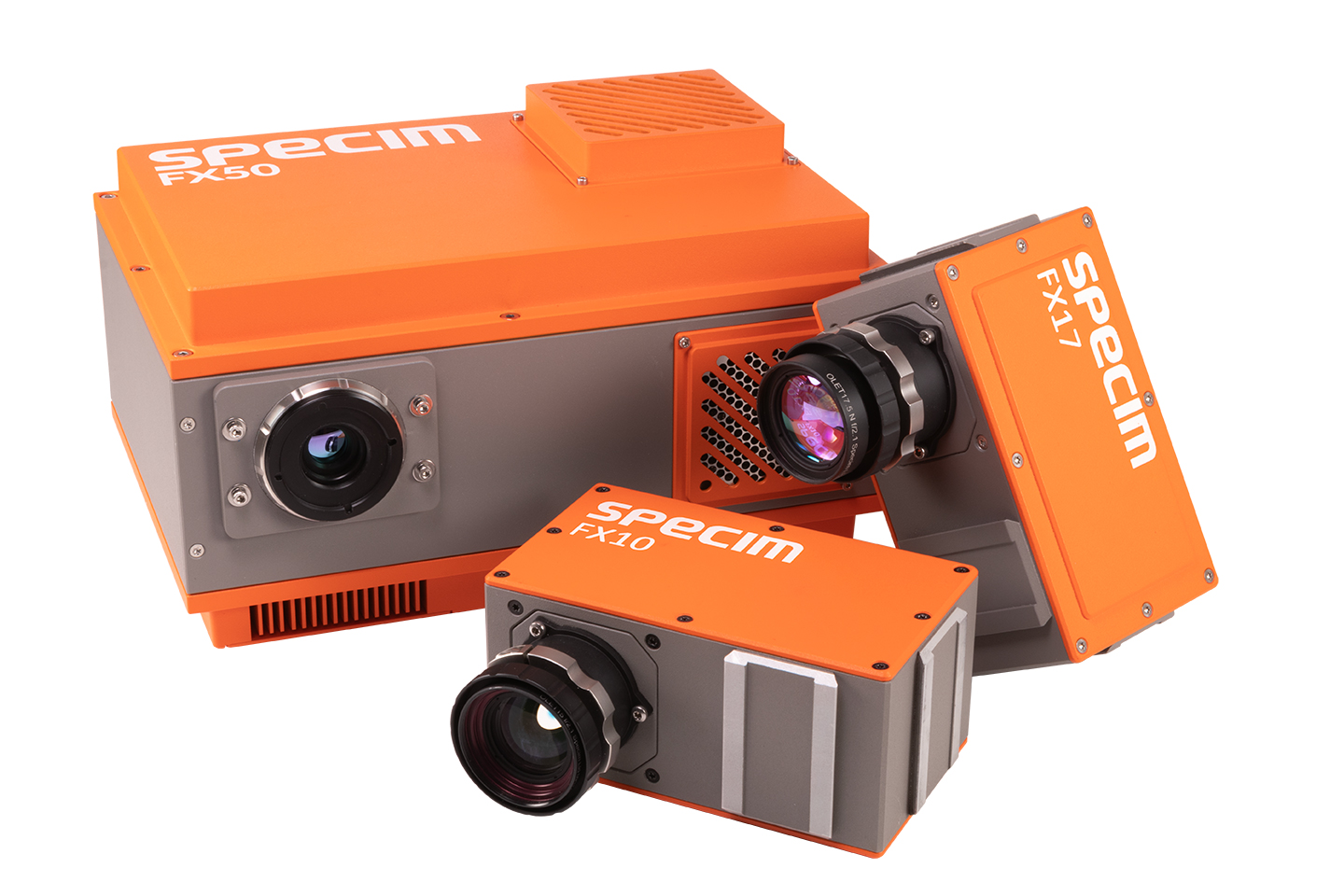
Specim FX series cameras.

In 2016, Specim announced the launch of new camera series, the Specim FX series, designed for industrial needs. Specim FX10 and FX17 were the first in a series of small, fast and flexible FX cameras for industrial applications e.g. food processing, recycling and pharmaceuticals.

In 2017, Specim revealed the World’s first mobile hyperspectral camera, Specim IQ, which allows you to make hyperspectral measurements and analysis anywhere. Specim IQ is a full hyperspectral imaging system that combines a spectral camera, a scanner, a computer, a frame grabber, data acquisition and processing software, data storage, a display, a keyboard, and power supplies in one mobile device. Since its launch, the Specim IQ has been used in various on-site studies in phenotyping and archaeology, ranging from analysing rock paintings to studying cultural heritage inside a Pharaoh's tomb and plant phenotyping and disease analysis.

In the spring of 2020, Specim’s investors and founders felt the company had reached a suitable point of maturity and opportunity, complemented by external interest, and initiated a competitive trade sale process resulting in offers from several global players. Of these, the Board determined Konica Minolta to be the perfect home for Specim’s technology, customers and employees. In November 2020 Konica Minolta acquired Specim, Spectral Imaging Ltd. to be part of their sensing business. After the acquisition Specim will maintain its existing offices and facilities in Oulu.
