= Whisk broom scanner =

Type of space instrument used to obtain satellite images with optical sensors

Visualization of how a whisk broom scanner captures imagery. The dark blue squares represent the subset of the area seen by the scanner at any given time and the lighter blue squares show previously scanned areas. The size of the subset may change between a single pixel (one square) or a spotlight (multiple squares) but the motion remains the same.

Operation of an orbital whisk-broom (top) vs push-broom (bottom) imager

A whisk broom or spotlight sensor, also known as an across-track scanner, is a technology for obtaining satellite images with optical cameras. It is used for passive remote sensing from space. In a whisk broom sensor, a mirror scans across the satellite’s path (ground track), reflecting light into a single detector which collects data one pixel at a time. The name refers to the back-and-forth sweeping motion of the area being scanned, similar to the motion of a whisk broom.

The moving parts make this type of sensor expensive and more prone to wearing out, such as in the Landsat 7. Whisk broom scanners have the effect of stopping the scan, and focusing the detector on one part of the swath width. Because the detector is only focused on a subsection of the full swath at any time, it typically has a higher resolution than a push broom design for the same size of scan swath.

All sensors aboard the Landsat series of satellites used the whisk broom design until Landsat 8 which used a push broom sensor.

== See also ==
- Push broom scanner
