= Push broom scanner =

Spectroscopic imaging device

Visualization of how a push broom scanner captures imagery. The dark purple squares represent the subset of the area seen by the scanner at any given time and the lighter purple squares show previously scanned areas.

Operation of an orbital push-broom (top) vs whisk-broom (bottom) imager

A push broom scanner, also known as an along-track scanner, is a moving array of spectroscopic sensors used to obtain an image. The name "push-broom" references how the sensors 'sweep' out an area similar to how a floor broom is pushed forward to clean an area. The scanners are regularly used for passive remote sensing from space, and in spectral analysis on production lines, for example with near-infrared spectroscopy used to identify contaminated food and feed. The moving scanner line in a traditional photocopier (or a scanner or facsimile machine) is also a familiar, everyday example of a push broom scanner. Push broom scanners and the whisk broom scanners variant (also known as across-track scanners) are often contrasted with staring arrays (such as in a digital camera), which image objects without scanning, and are more familiar to most people.

In orbital push broom sensors, a line of sensors arranged perpendicular to the flight direction of the spacecraft is used. Different areas of the surface are imaged as the spacecraft flies forward. A push broom scanner can gather more light than a whisk broom scanner because it looks at a particular area for a longer time, like a long exposure on a camera. One drawback of push broom sensors is the varying sensitivity of the individual detectors. Another drawback is that the resolution is lower than a whisk broom scanner because the entire image is captured at once.

Examples of spacecraft cameras using push broom imagers include Mars Express's High Resolution Stereo Camera, Lunar Reconnaissance Orbiter Camera NAC, Mars Global Surveyor's Mars Orbiter Camera WAC, and the Multi-angle Imaging SpectroRadiometer on board the Terra satellite.

== See also ==
- Time delay and integration
- Whisk broom scanner
- Rolling shutter
