= Joss Bland-Hawthorn =

British-Australian astronomer

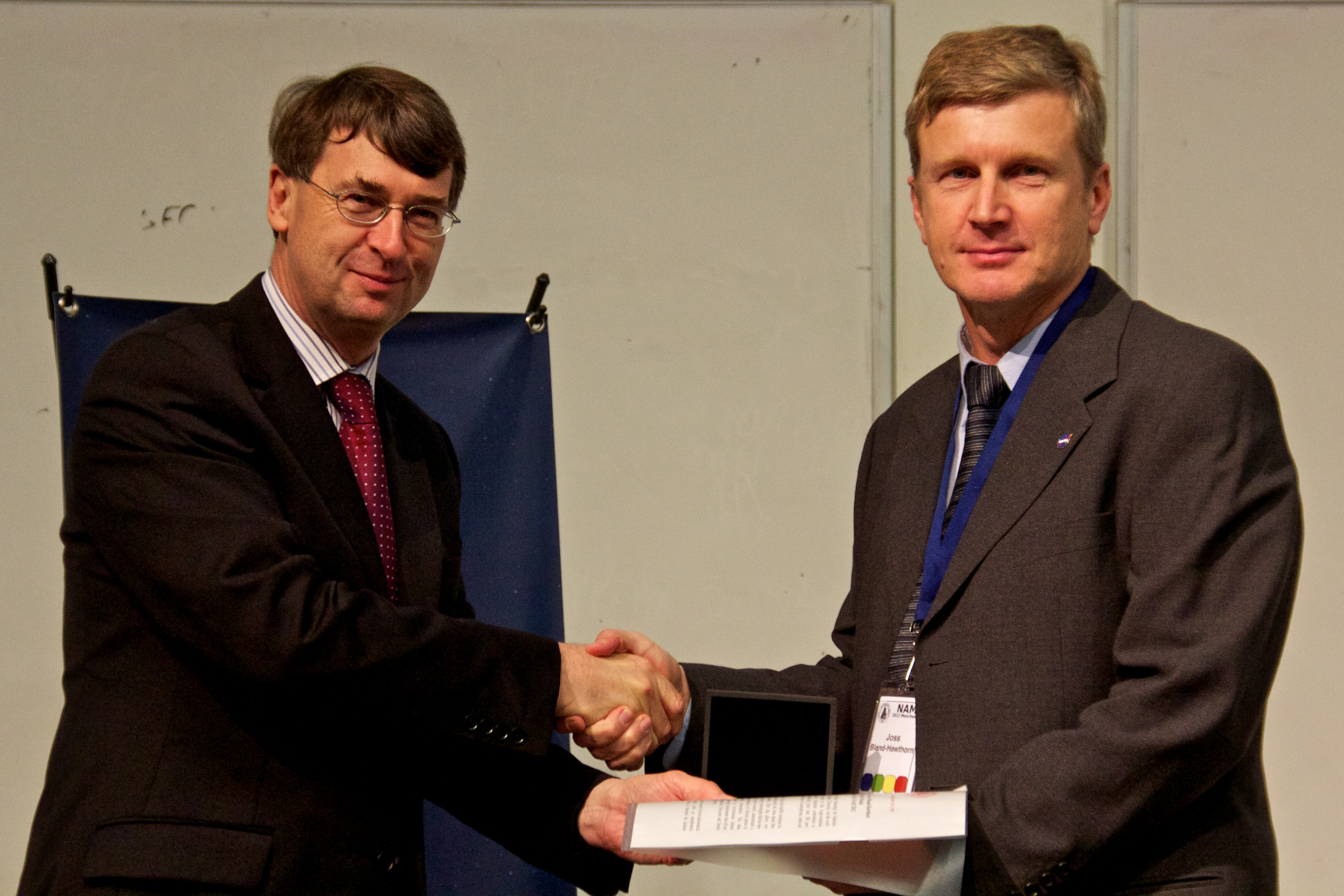
- Joss Bland-Hawthorn (right) with Roger Davies (left) in 2012
- Born: 31 May 1959; Ide Hill, Kent, England
- Citizenship: Australian, British
- Known for: Galactic archaeology Near-field cosmology Galaxia simulator Astronomical instrumentation Astrophotonics: photonic lantern
- Awards: ARC Federation Fellow Professorship (2007); Muhlmann Award (ASP) (2011); Jackson-Gwilt Medal (RAS) (2012); ARC Laureate Professor of Astrophysics (2014); WH Steel Medal (Australian Optical Society) (2015); Peter McGregor Team Prize (ASA (2016); New South Wales Scientist of the Year (2016); Thomas Ranken Lyle Medal (AAS (2017); HiCi Laureate and Australian Research Leader (2019-20); Walter Boas Medal (AIP) (2020); Doctor Honoris Causa, Université d'Aix-Marseille (2022)
- Scientific career
- Fields: Astrophysics; Photonics and optics
- Workplaces: Royal Greenwich Observatory; Institute for Astronomy, Hawaii; Rice University, Texas; Anglo-Australian Observatory, Sydney; The University of Sydney
- Thesis: The Structure and Dynamics of Ionised Gas within NGC 5128 (Centaurus A) (1986)
- Website: www.sydney.edu.au/science/about/our-people/academic-staff/jonathan-bland-hawthorn.html

Jonathan (Joss) Bland-Hawthorn (born 31 May 1959 in Ide Hill, Kent, England) is a British-Australian astrophysicist. He is a Laureate professor of physics at the University of Sydney, and director of the Sydney Institute for Astronomy.

== Early life and education ==
Bland-Hawthorn was born 31 May 1959 in Ide Hill, Kent, England. He was educated at Kingham Hill School (1970–1977). He earned a degree in computer science, mathematics, and physics at the University of Birmingham before pursuing his PhD in astrophysics and astronomy at the University of Sussex and the Royal Greenwich Observatory. His dissertation, The Structure and Dynamics of the Ionised Gas within NGC 5128 (Centaurus A), was completed and approved in 1986.

== Career ==
In 1985, Bland-Hawthorn took a three-year postdoctoral position studying astrophysics at the University of Hawaii's Institute for Astronomy. In 1988, he briefly did research at Princeton University and Institute for Advanced Study; the Lawrence Livermore National Laboratory; the United States Naval Research Laboratory, and the Space Telescope Science Institute before accepting a tenured professorship at Rice University in the space, physics, and astronomy department. He held this role until 1993, when he took another research fellowship, this time at the Space Telescope Science Institute in Baltimore. Later that year, he moved to Australia and joined the Anglo-Australian Observatory in Sydney as a physicist until 2000, when he became the Head of Instrument Science. He was awarded with an ARC Federation Fellow Professorship in 2007 and left the Observatory to teach physics and work as Director of the Sydney Institute for Astronomy (SIfA) within the University of Sydney's School of Physics. In 2008, he was given the Muhlmann Award from the ASP and shared the inaugural Group Achievement Award from the Royal Astronomical Society with 32 colleagues including John A. Peacock, Warrick Couch, and Karl Glazebrook.

In 2009, he co-founded the Institute of Photonics and Optical Science (IPOS), a collaborative group of physicists, electrical engineers, mathematicians, and chemists. The following year, he was Leverhulme Professor and visiting fellow at Merton College, Oxford. In 2011, he was a Brittingham Scholar at the University of Wisconsin. Bland-Hawthorn was awarded the Jackson-Gwilt Medal in 2012 by the Royal Astronomical Society and was made a fellow of the Australian Academy of Science and the Optical Society of America. He became an ARC Laureate Fellow in 2014 and received the W.H. Steel Medal from the Australian and New Zealand Optical Society in 2015. In 2016, he was presented with the NSW Premier's Prize for Excellence in Mathematics, Earth Sciences, Chemistry and Physics for the development of the Galactic Archaeology survey, and the Astronomical Society of Australia's Peter McGregor Team Prize. In 2017, he was given the Thomas Ranken Lyle Medal by the Australian Academy of Science for the development of the fields astrophotonics and galactic archaeology. He worked at the University of California, Berkeley in 2018 as a visiting Miller Professor and is the sixth Australian to receive this honour. In 2019-21, he was a HiCi Laureate/Australian Research Leader in astronomy and astrophysics and the highest ranked physicist in Australia by Research.com. In 2021, he was awarded the Walter Boas Medal by the AIP and granted a visiting professor fellowship at École normale supérieure in Paris. In 2022, he was awarded a Doctor Honoris Causa by the University of Aix-Marseille and honoured by Anti-slavery Australia for his collaborative work on novel ways to track modern slavery in supply chains.

He is the Project Scientist and founder of the Sydney Astrophotonic Instrumentation Lab (SAIL) and the Director of the Sydney Institute for Astronomy, both at the University of Sydney. He was elected an International Honorary Member of the American Academy of Arts and Sciences in 2023. Bland-Hawthorn sits on several boards, including: Astronomy Australia Limited, The Australis Board, and the Annual Review of Astronomy and Astrophysics.

== Research ==
Bland-Hawthorn first coined the term "near-field cosmology," which looks at the early physical histories of stars and galaxies, in his Nature article Clues to galaxy formation and in 2002 co-wrote an Annual Review article with Ken Freeman giving a more detailed description of this topic. The Annual Review paper additionally introduces galactic archaeology, chemical tagging, and the use of high spectroscopic resolution to conduct mass star surveys. This technology has been in use since 1993 and still plays a large part in surveys such as the APO Galactic Evolution Experiment (APOGEE), the Radial Velocity Experiment (RAVE), Gaia-ESO (GES), Large Sky Area Multi-Object Fibre Spectroscopic Telescope (LAMOST), the William Herschel Telescope Enhanced Area Velocity Explorer (WEAVE), and 4MOST, as well as the Galactic Archaeology with HERMES (GALAH) with which he is involved. In 2011, Bland-Hawthorn, Sanjib Sharma, Kathryn Johnston, and James Binney developed Galaxia, a galaxy model simulation code. In 2016, he and Ortwin Gerhard were able to identify properties of the Milky Way that could act as a fossil record.

Bland-Hawthorn is particularly interested in the Milky Way. In 2003, he and Martin Cohen wrote about the galaxy's bipolar x-ray wind, which they spotted using the ROSAT satellite; this theory was not proven until 2010. Bland-Hawthorn continues to write about simulated galactic winds and Smith's Cloud. He wrote several articles showing that high-velocity HI clouds are within the Galactic halo rather than at megaparsec distances as originally thought. He was also the first to show that the HI disc in the outer parts of spiral galaxies undergoes a phase change and becomes ionized.

In 2000, he established the field of astrophotonics. Among the many technologies and instruments he has worked on and developed over his career are the photonic lantern, OH-suppression fibres, hexabundles, and the photonic integrated multimode microspectrograph; all of these also have applications in other fields. Bland-Hawthorn's experimental work in 2021 focuses on exploratory use of quantum technologies in the field of astronomy. He and colleagues John Bartholomew and Matt Sellars proposed that quantum memories at different telescopes can be combined to perform very-long-baseline interferometry at infrared wavelengths.

Bland-Hawthorn has more than 1,000 publications and has been cited upwards of 65,000 times according to ResearchGate.

== Interests ==
His main research interests include:

=== Near-field Cosmology ===
- Galactic archaeology
- Galactic seismology & dynamics
- Chemical tagging
- Ultra-faint dwarf galaxies
- First stars: chemical signatures
- Accretion and outflows

=== Astrophotonics & Quantum Astronomy ===
- Quantum telescope networks
- Broadband fibre Bragg gratings
- Integrated photonic spectrographs
- Hexabundles & photonic lanterns
- Photonic & laser combs
- Photon orbital angular momentum

=== 3D Spectrographs & Differential Techniques ===
- Tunable imaging filters
- Fabry–Pérot interferometers
- Integral field spectrographs
- OH-suppression
- Nod & shuffle and charge shuffling techniques

== Personal life ==
He and his wife Sue have two sons Christian and Luke.
