= IFU =

IFU or ifu may refer to:

- Integral field unit
- International Fruit and Vegetable Juice Association
- Instruction fetch unit
- Instructions for Use
- "IFU", song by Usher (singer)
