= SDSS J131642.90+175332.5 =

Emission-line galaxy in the constellation Coma Berenices

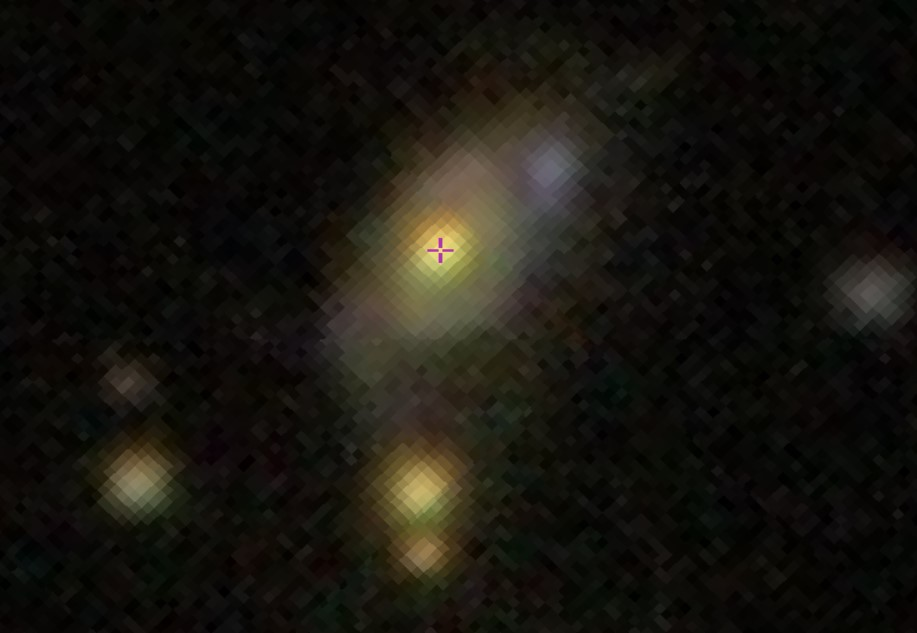
- The emission line galaxy, SDSS J131642.90+175332.5

Observation data (J2000.0 epoch)
- Constellation: Coma Berenices
- Right ascension: 13^{h} 16^{m} 42.87^{s}
- Declination: +17° 53′ 32.80″
- Redshift: 0.150347
- Heliocentric radial velocity: 45,073 ± 4 km/s
- Distance: 2,182.0 ± 152.7 Mly (669.01 ± 46.83 Mpc)
- magnitude (K): 13.78

Characteristics
- Type: AGN2, EmLG
- Size: ~255,000 ly (78.2 kpc) (estimated)
- Notable features: Double peaked emission lines

Other designations
- LEDA 1544588, 2MASS J13164290+1753326, NVSS J131642+175333

SDSS J131642.90+175332.5 known as J1316+1753 or J1316+17, is an emission line galaxy with an active galactic nucleus, located in the constellation of Coma Berenices. At the redshift of z = 0.15, the object is located 2.18 billion light years from Earth. It is considered remarkable because unlike other galaxies, SDSS J131642.90+175332.5 shows all double-peaked narrow emission lines including an extra large component.

== Characteristics ==
SDSS J131642.90+175332.5 is classified a spiral galaxy with two prominent spiral arms, based on an optical continuum image from Multi-unit spectroscopic explorer (MUSE) data, with smaller galaxy companions located within its position.

The galaxy has a luminosity of L_{[OIII]} = 10^{42.8} erg s^{−1} according to a QfeedS sample of bright sources. The star formation rate of SDSS J131642.90+175332.5 is estimated to be 30 ± 10 M_{☉} yr^{−1} with a stellar mass of 10^{11} M_{☉} according to a spectral energy distribution fitting observed in ultraviolet to far-infrared radiation, making it a star-forming galaxy. It is also a bright type-2 quasar.

The radio luminosity for SDSS J131642.90+175332.5 is L_{1.4GHz} = 10^{23.8} W Hz^{−1}. Although the galaxy harbors a radio active galactic nucleus, it is found to be radio-quiet based on a study made by Xu in 1999.

SDSS J131642.90+175332.5 has a complex radio morphology. It contains three components, consisting of a radio core and two hotspots linked by the galaxy's low-powered radio jets (P_{jet} ~ 10^{44} erg s^{−1}). Both hotspots have estimated distances of 0.91 and 1.40 kiloparsecs, while the radio core has a 1.5-7 GHz spectral index.

== Jet-induced feedback ==
SDSS J131642.90+175332.5 has signs of jet-induced feedback caused by the inclination of its radio jets into the plane of the disc. At the jet hotspot positions, two ionized gas components are separated by 441 kilometers (km) s^{−1} which appears moving away from the jets. Beyond a brighter radio hotspot, molecular gas velocity is seen switching with possible hints of carbon oxide emitted gas. Evidence also points out, the ionized gas is travelling in perpendicular motion to its disk at a distance of 7.5 kpc from its nucleus, with a velocity-dispersion of W_{80} ≈ 1000 -1300 km s^{−1}. The stellar bulge's position angle is seen closely aligned together with the radio-jet axis. This three clues strong hints the jets in SDSS J131642.90+175332.5 are interacting with the interstellar medium.

== Emission lines ==
SDSS J131642.90+175332.5 displays many emission lines. They exhibit all double-peaked profiles in which for each of the double peaks, the low redshift systems are known to be "blue systems", whereas the high redshift systems are "red systems". The blue systems are located at redshift of 0.1491 while the red systems have a redshift of 0.1510. Both have a full width at half maximum (FHWM) of 140 km s^{−1} and 480 km s^{−1} respectively, with a velocity separation of ~ 500 km s^{−1}. Additionally, an underlying extra component is seen between both red and blue systems. It has a FHWM of 1400 km s^{−1}.

According to integral field observations, a very large doubly ionized oxygen emission-line profile (W_{80} ≈ 1100 - 1200 km s^{−1}) is discovered. It has a projected expansion of over ≥ 14 kpc. Looking at its velocity profile, the emission line flux ratio log is shown lessening with a projected break radius (R_{br} = 5 kpc). Based on the annulus of the break radius, a Hβ surface brightness (Σ_{Hβ} = 6.2 x 10^{−16} erg s^{−1} arcsec^{−2}) is calculated for the emission-line profile.
