= Multi-Unit Spectroscopic Explorer =

Integral field spectrograph installed at the Very Large Telescope

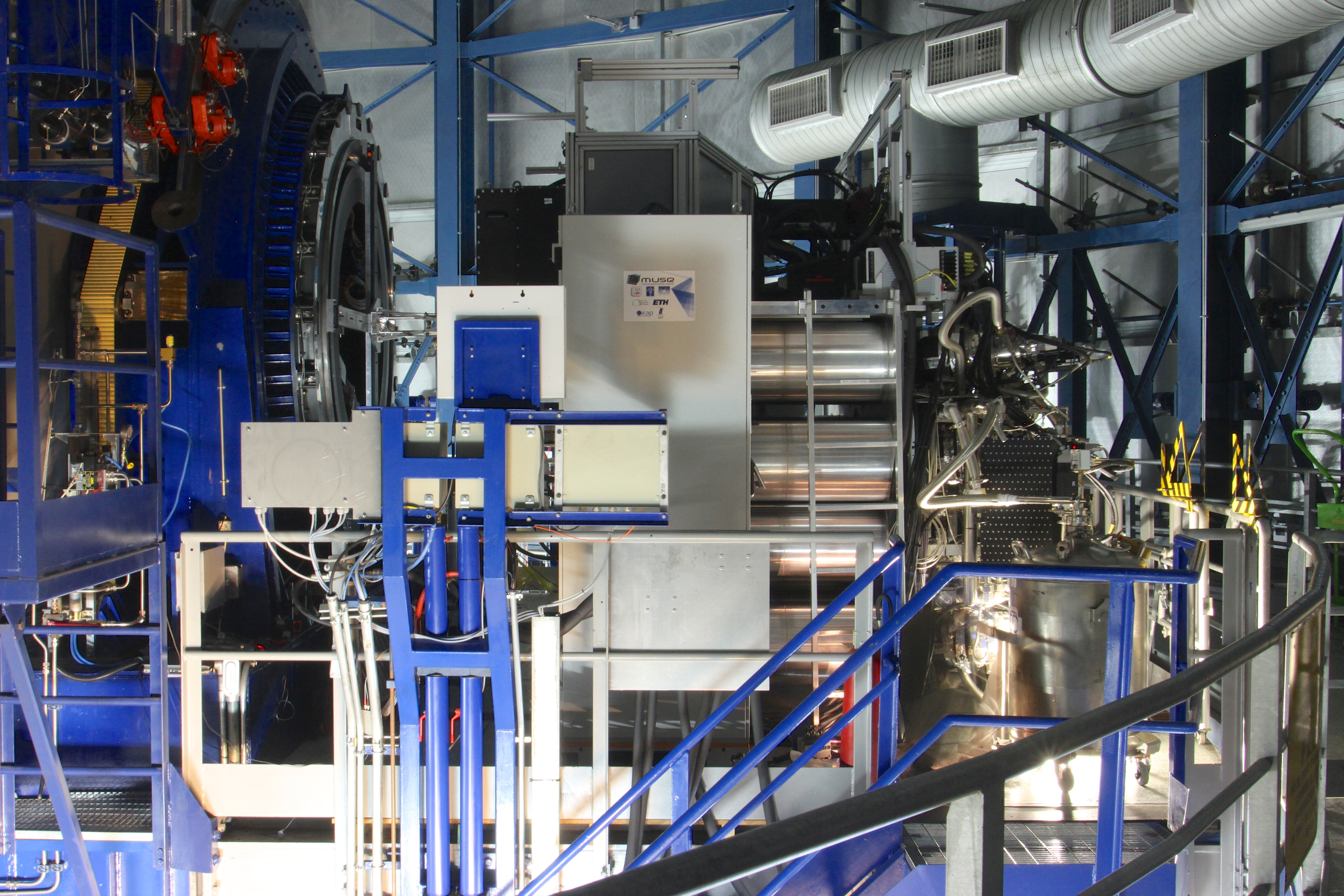
MUSE mounted on the VLT Yepun (UT4)

The Multi-Unit Spectroscopic Explorer (MUSE) is an integral field spectrograph installed at the Very Large Telescope (VLT) of the European Southern Observatory (ESO). It operates in the visible wavelength range, and combines a wide field of view with a high spatial resolution and a large simultaneous spectral range (480-930 nm). It is specifically designed to take advantage of the improved spatial resolution provided by adaptive optics, offering diffraction-limited performance in specific configurations. MUSE had first light on the VLT’s Unit Telescope 4 (UT4) on 31 January 2014.

== Background ==
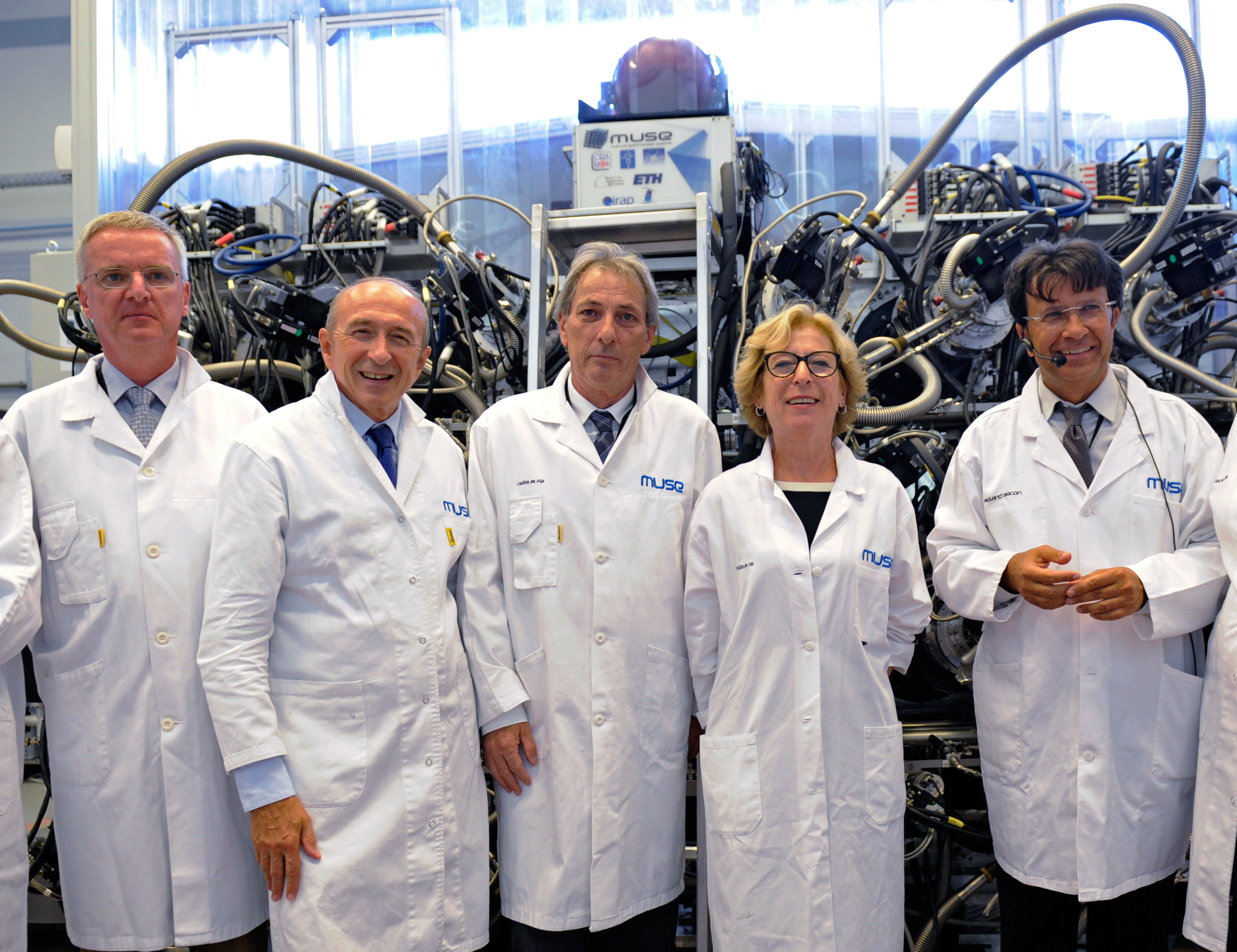
MUSE at the Lyon Observatory: The ESO director general, two local politicians, the university president, and the instrument's principal investigator

Traditionally astronomical observations in the optical region have been separated into imaging and spectroscopy. The former can cover a wide field of view, but at the cost of a very coarse resolution in the wavelength direction. The latter has tended to either lose spatial resolution - completely in the case of fibre spectrographs, and partially in the case of long-slit spectrographs - or to have only coarse spatial resolving power in the case of recent integral field spectrographs.

MUSE was devised to improve on this situation by providing both high spatial resolution as well as a good spectral coverage. The principal investigator of the instrument is Roland Bacon at the Lyon Centre for Astrophysics Research (CRAL) in charge of a consortium consisting of six major European institutes: CRAL at Lyon Observatory is the PI institute and led the construction of the majority of the instrument. Other involved institutes include the German Institut für Astrophysik Göttingen (IAG) and the Leibniz Institute for Astrophysics Potsdam (AIP), the Netherlands Research School for Astronomy (NOVA), the Institut de Recherche en Astrophysique et Planétologie (IRAP), France, ETH Zürich, Switzerland as well as the European Southern Observatory (ESO).

The kick-off for the project was January 18, 2005 with the final design review in March 2009. The instrument passed its final acceptance in Europe on September 10, 2013 MUSE was mounted on the Nasmyth platform of the fourth VLT Unit telescope on January 19, 2014, and saw first light on January 31, 2014.

== Scientific goals ==
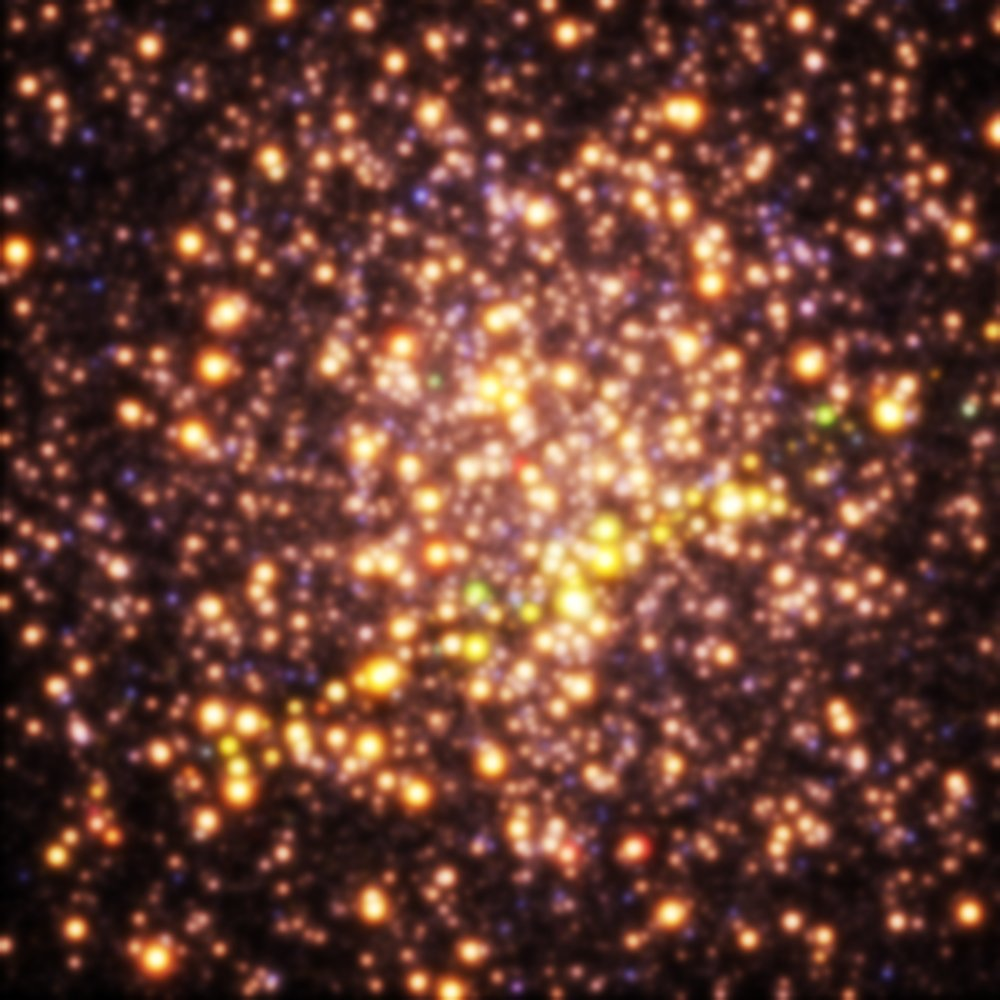
A simulation of how MUSE will see the globular cluster NGC 2808. This colour image has been created by first creating a simulated MUSE observation of the globular cluster and then extract three spectral regions from this data cube. Thus for each source in this image there is an entire spectrum.

=== Stars and resolved stellar populations ===
MUSE has a field of view that is well-matched to a number of objects in the Milky Way, such as globular clusters and planetary nebulae. The high spatial resolution and sampling will enable MUSE to simultaneously observe the spectra of thousands of stars in one shot in dense regions such as globular clusters. In star-forming regions, with a mixture of ionised gas and stars, MUSE will provide information both on the stellar and nebular content across this region.

=== Lyman-alpha emitters ===
A key goal of the design of MUSE was to be able to study the progenitors of normal nearby galaxies out to redshifts z > 6. These sources can be extremely faint, in which case they can only be detected using through the emission in the Lyman-alpha emission line, such galaxies are frequently referred to as Lyman-alpha emitters.

A common way to study such sources is to use narrow-band imaging, but this technique can only survey a very narrow redshift range at a time – set by the width of the filter. In addition this method is not as sensitive as direct spectroscopic studies because the width of the filter is wider than the typical width of an emission line.

Since MUSE is a spectrograph with a 1'x1' field of view, it can be used to search for emission line sources over a wide range in redshift (z = 2.9–6.65 for Lyman-alpha) at the same time. It is expected that the instrument will be used for exposures of up to 100 hours, in which case it should reach a limiting flux of 3 × 10^{−19} erg/s/cm^{2} which is an order of magnitude fainter than current narrow-band imaging surveys.

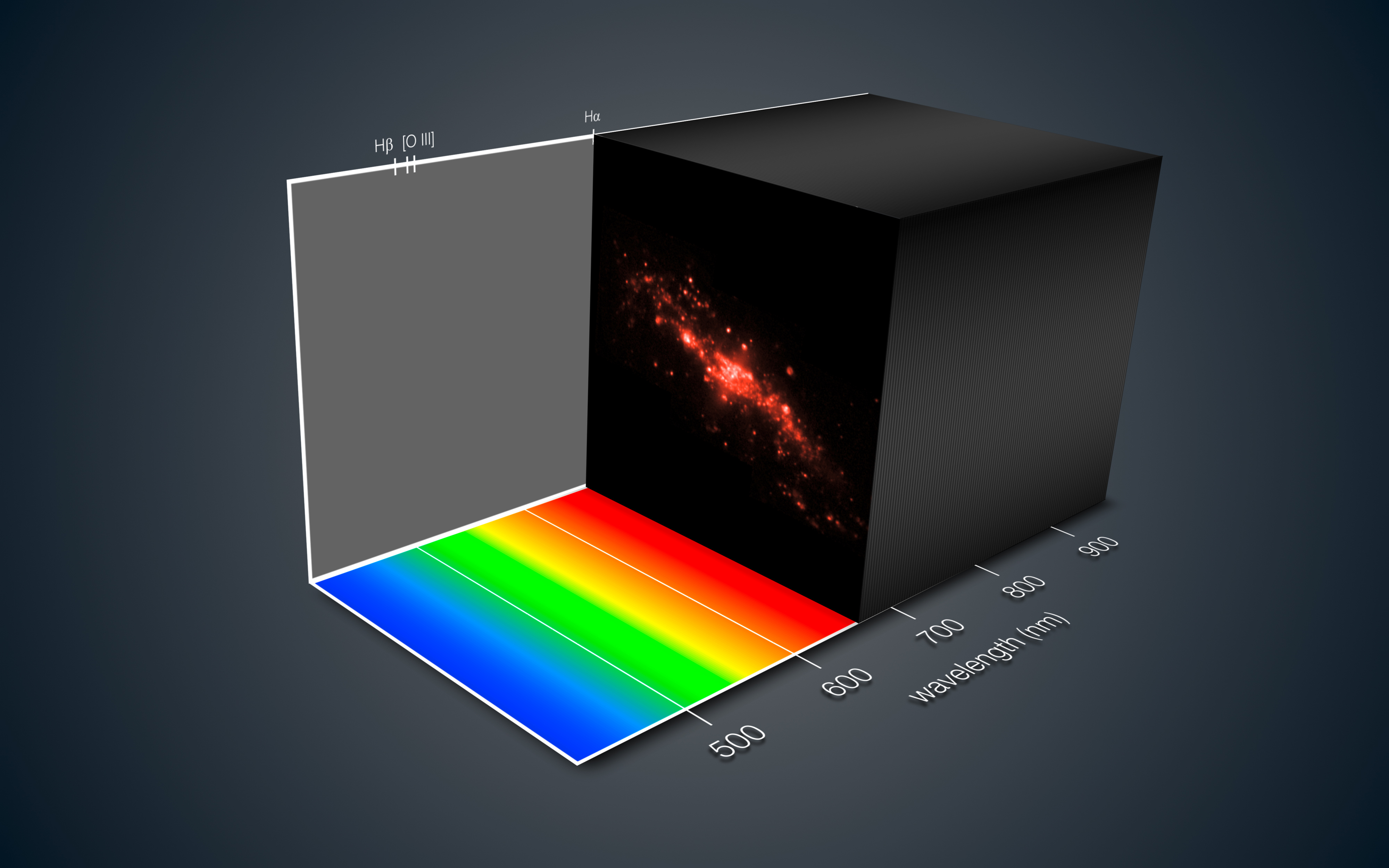
MUSE views the strange galaxy NGC 4650A

=== Galaxy evolution ===
MUSE will be a powerful instrument for studying the dynamical properties of galaxies from the nearby Universe out to at least a redshift of 1.4, after which the [O II] forbidden emission line at 372.7 nm disappears off the red end of the spectrograph.

At low redshift MUSE will provide two-dimensional maps of the kinematics and the stellar populations in all types of galaxies. It will build on and expand the science done with the SAURON instrument on the William Herschel Telescope, extending it to both larger radii and to more distant galaxies. With the narrow-field mode, MUSE will be able to zoom in on the region around the super-massive black hole at the centre of massive galaxies. It is hoped that this will help astronomers understand the process by which these giants formed - likely through a merging process whereby two black holes coalesce to form a more massive end product and at the same time perturbing the stellar orbits in the centre of the galaxy.

At higher redshift MUSE will provide the power to construct maps of the distribution of metals in galaxies and at the same time provide constraints on the dynamical structure of these objects. Combining this with environmental information due to the wide field of view (1 arcminute corresponds to 430 kilo-parsec at a redshift of 0.7) it will be possible to study how the properties of galaxies are affected by the environment they find themselves in a very powerful, and mostly new, way.

=== Science with the narrow field mode ===
MUSE will also have a high spatial resolution mode with a field of view of 7.5 × 7.5 arcsec and a spatial resolution of 0.042 arcsec at 750 nm. The main scientific use of this mode is for studying in detail more nearby systems such as the environment around supermassive black holes in nearby galaxies. In particular it will be possible to resolve the sphere of influence of the black holes in most massive galaxies out to the Virgo Cluster and for the most massive galaxies also in the Coma cluster of galaxies.

Closer to home, MUSE will be able to study jets in nearby star forming regions and the surfaces of a range of Solar System objects. This could for instance be used to carry out spectroscopic monitoring studies of volcanic activity on Io and spectroscopic studies of the atmosphere of Titan.

== Technical ==
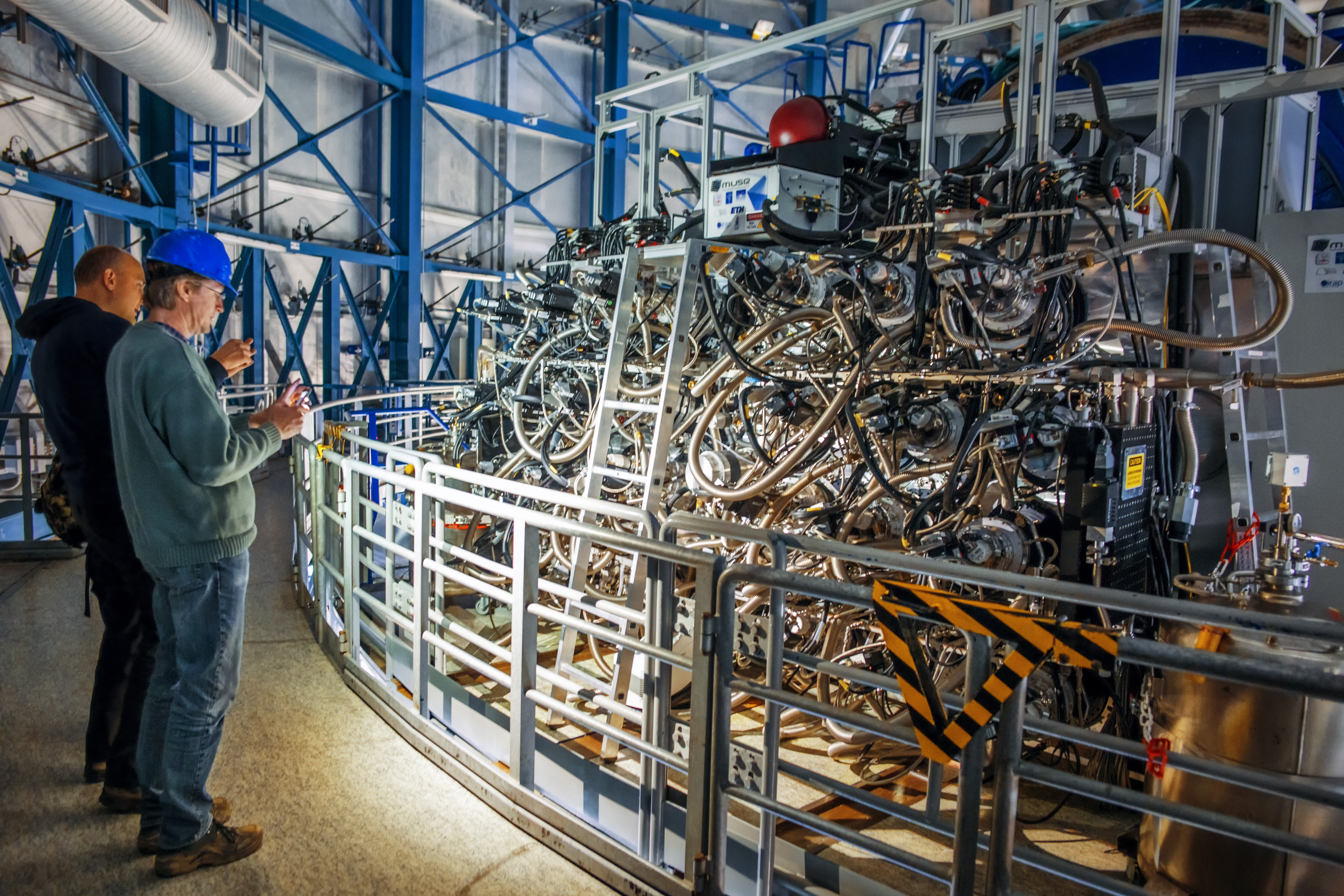
Intricate network of pipes surrounding the 24 spectrographs of the MUSE instrument.

Instrument characteristics
Wide-Field Mode
Field of view	1 × 1 arcmin
Spatial sampling	0.2 × 0.2 arcsec
Spatial resolution at 0.75 μm (median seeing)	0.46 arcsec (AO); 0.65 arcsec (non AO)
Sky coverage with AO	70% at Galactic pole 99% at Galactic equator
Limiting magnitude in 80h	I_{AB} = 25.0 (Full resolution); I_{AB} = 26.7 (R=180 degraded resolution)
Limiting flux in 80h	3.9 × 10^{−19} erg/s/cm^{2}
Narrow-Field Mode
Field of view	7.5 × 7.5 arcsec
Spatial sampling	0.025 × 0.025 arcsec
Spatial resolution at 0.75 μm (median seeing)	0.042 arcsec
Strehl ratio at 0.75 μm	5% (10% goal)
Limiting magnitude in 1h	R_{AB} = 22.3
Limiting flux in 1h	2.3 × 10^{−18} erg/s/cm^{2}
Limit surface brightness in 1h (mag)	R^{AB}=17.3 arcsec^{−2}

To meet the scientific aims of the instrument, MUSE has had to fulfill a number of requirements:

- The instrument should have high throughput.
- The ability to carry out very long integrations, thus the instrument has to be very stable.
- In combination with adaptive optics the instrument should achieve allow a boost in spatial resolution relative to seeing limited observations across the field of view across the celestial sphere.
- A wide field of view, allowing survey operation
- Efficient production to reduce cost, and efficient design to fit within the volume and mass constraints.

To achieve the latter two points, the spectrograph consists of 24 identical integral field units (IFU), hence reducing cost by replication. These have each excellent image quality and light in the instrument plan is slice up and sent to individual IFUs using an image slicer.

The spectrograph design has achieved an excellent image quality across the spectral bandwidth of MUSE with the tilt of the detector compensating for axial chromaticism. With such a design, expensive optical materials such as CaF_{2} are not needed, thus reducing the overall cost.

The throughput is kept high by using high quantum efficiency CCDs. There is also only one grating, a high transmission volume phase holographic grating. This has given a throughput that peaks above 50% around 700-800 nm and exceeds 40% across almost the entire wavelength range of the instrument.

The full instrument weighs close to eight metric tons and essentially fills the Nasmyth platform's volume of 50 m^{3}. But due to the modular design, each of the 24 IFUs can be removed for maintenance or repair - in order to do this a special cradle was designed to safely remove and insert an IFU.

=== Adaptive optics interface ===
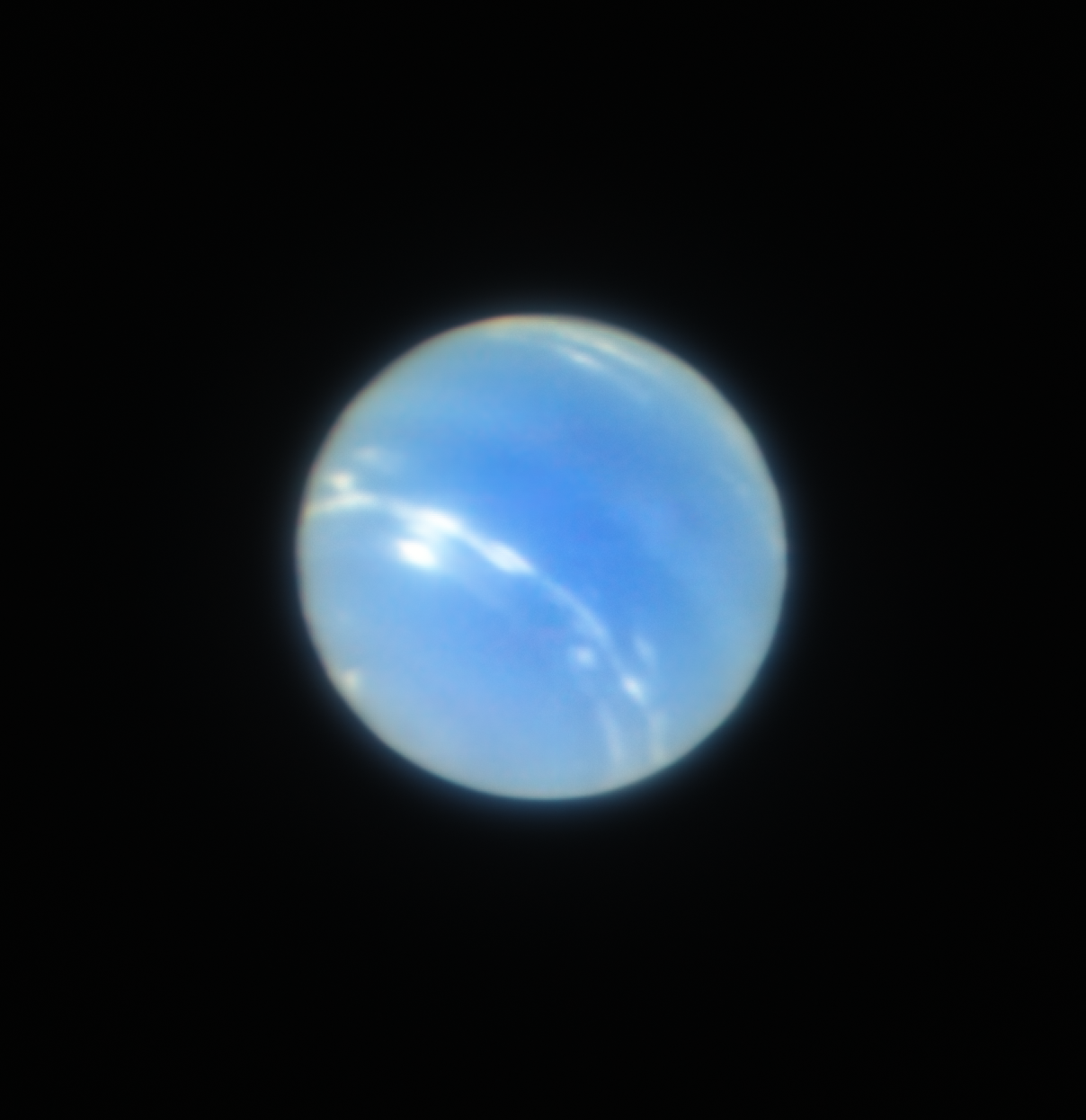
Neptune from the VLT with MUSE/GALACSI Narrow Field Mode adaptive optics.

In order to achieve the required boost in spatial resolution across the celestial sphere, MUSE makes use of the GALACSI interface which is part of the Adaptive Optics Facility on UT4 at VLT. All the adaptive optics (AO) components are all mounted in the Nasmyth derotator and a metrology system is used to ensure alignment of the AO system with MUSE. This is needed since MUSE is located on the Nasmyth platform.

Armed with the AO system, it is expected that MUSE will achieve a median spatial resolution of 0.46 arcseconds, or ~3 kpc at a redshift >3, across the 1'x1' field-of-view of the wide-field mode. In the narrow-field mode, the spatial resolution should reach 0.042 arcseconds at 750 nm, corresponding to ~3 pc resolution at the distance of Virgo Cluster of galaxies.

=== Data rates and management ===
Each exposure with MUSE will return a datafile with data from the 24 IFUs at 35 MB each - thus the total size of the raw datafile is 0.84 GB. After data reduction this will expand to a total of 3.2 GB per exposure as the data are translated into floating point values and an error estimate cube is produced. This means that observations that rely on many short exposures can produce very large datasets - easily producing 100 GB per night of fairly complex data.

== Operation and results ==
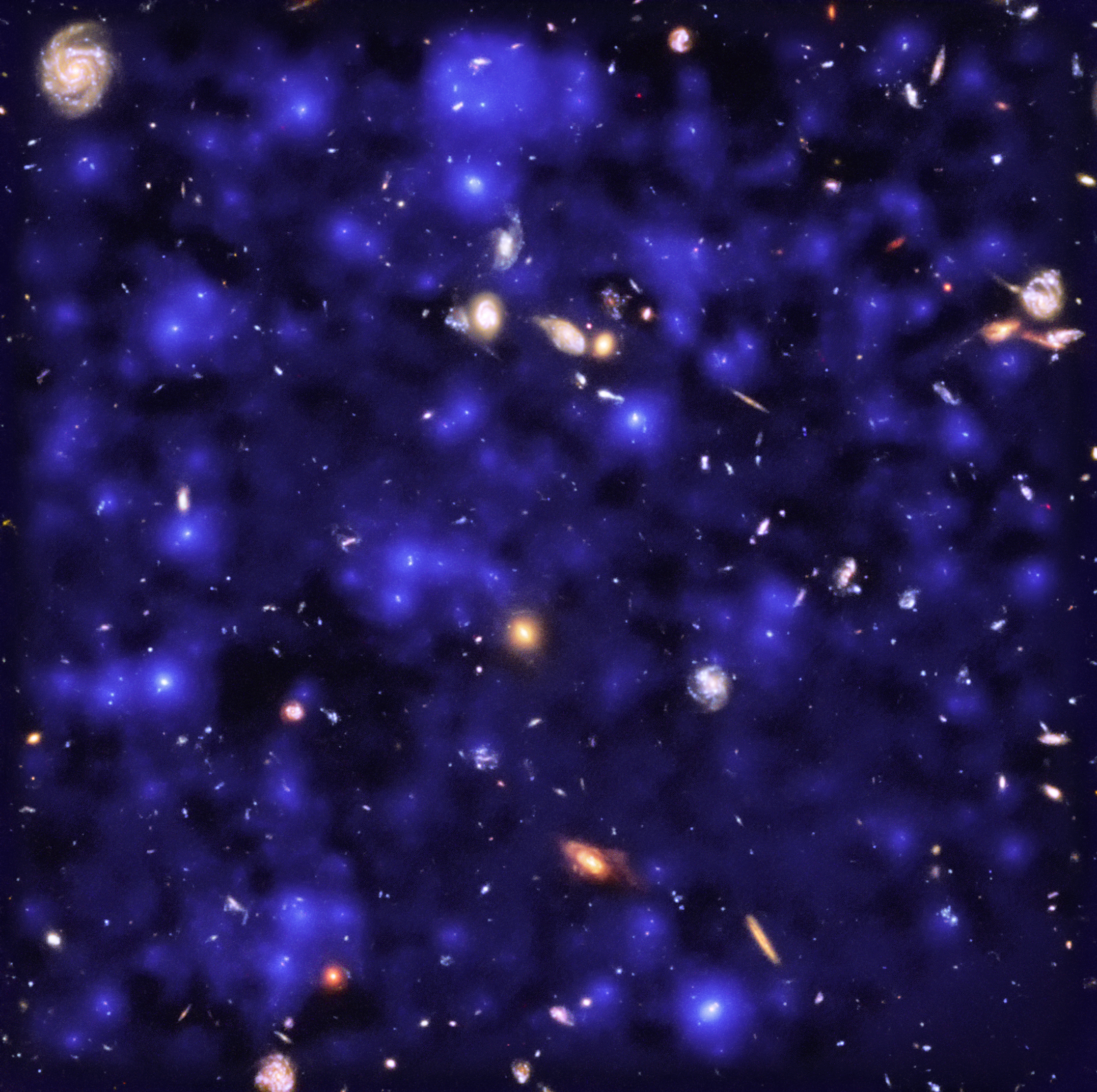
Deep observations made with the MUSE spectrograph.

ESO maintains a listing of published scientific papers that involve MUSE on their website.

== Gallery ==
This video sequence was created from many separate MUSE observations of the planet Jupiter during a transit of the moon Europa and its shadow.

This view shows how the instrument gives a three-dimensional view of the Orion Nebula.

This view shows how the instrument gives a three-dimensional view of a distant galaxy.

This view shows how the instrument gives a three-dimensional view of NGC 4650A.

Another view of how the instrument gives a three-dimensional view of NGC 4650A.

This view shows how MUSE gives a three-dimensional depiction of the galaxy ESO 137-001 as it falls into the vast Norma Galaxy Cluster and is stripped of its gas.
