= IC 5063 =

Galaxy in the constellation Indus

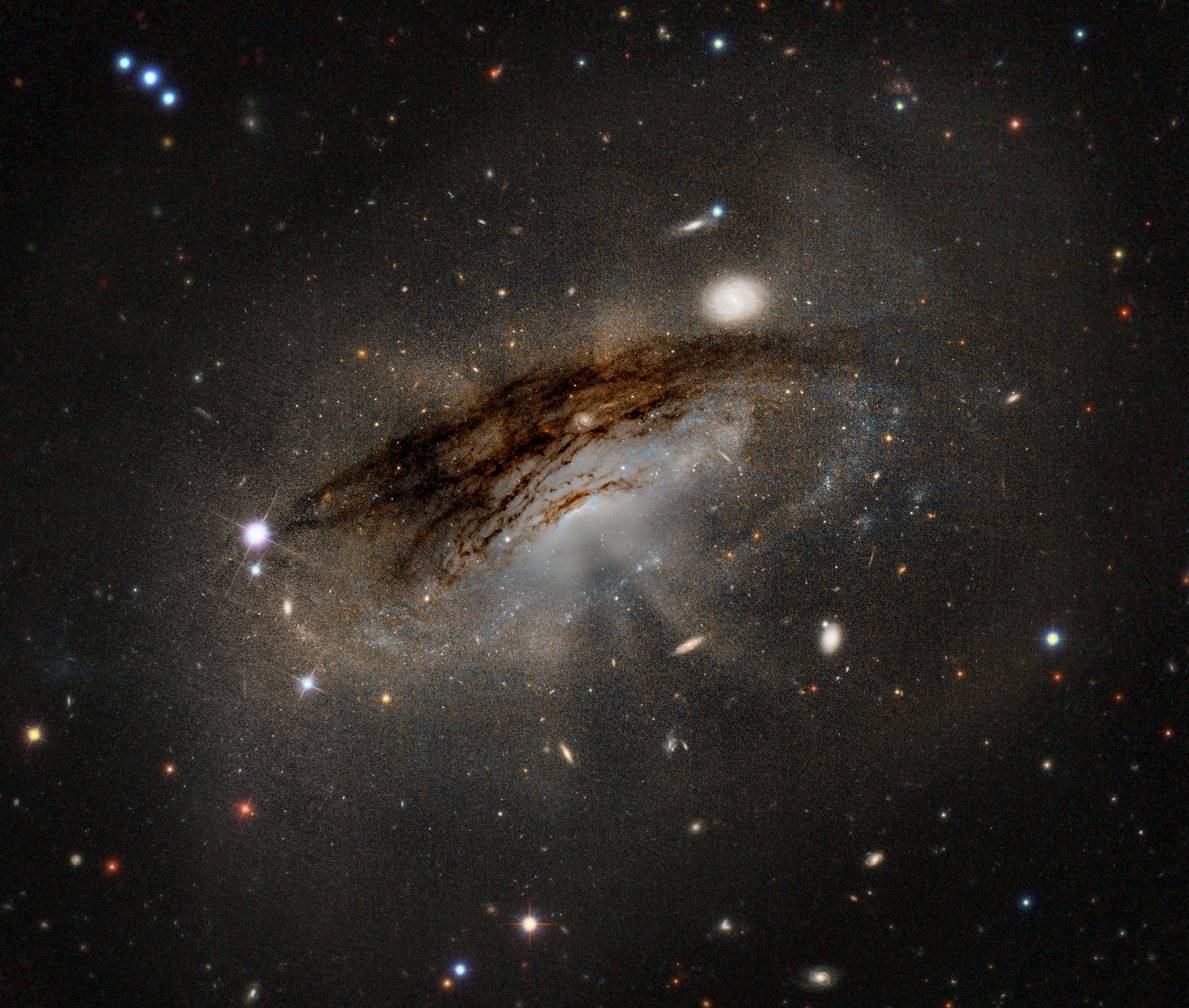
- IC 5063 with Hubble ACS and DESI legacy imaging surveys. The image shows the dust lanes and crepuscular rays. Image was created by Judy Schmidt.

Observation data (J2000 epoch)
- Constellation: Indus
- Right ascension: 20^{h} 52^{m} 02.15^{s}
- Declination: −57° 04′ 06.7″
- Redshift: 0.01126748±0.0005
- Heliocentric radial velocity: 3,402±6 km/s
- Galactocentric velocity: 3,342±6 km/s
- Distance: 160.8 ± 11.3 Mly (49.30 ± 3.45 Mpc)
- Apparent magnitude (V): 13.60
- Apparent magnitude (B): 12.92
- magnitude (J): 9.705
- magnitude (H): 9.024
- magnitude (K): 8.750

Characteristics
- Type: S0 or Sa
- Size: 46.24 kpc

Other designations
- IC 5063, PGC 65600

IC 5063 is a post-merger system and is a Seyfert 2 galaxy. This active galactic nucleus (AGN) produces on the one hand interactions with the interstellar medium (ISM) and large radio outflows. On the other hand, the accretion disk around the supermassive black hole, produces crepuscular rays. It is the first discovered case of a black hole disk producing such rays, but circumstellar disks around some young stars are already known to produce similar shadows. The crepuscular rays were first noted in an image by Judy Schmidt, who posted her image of IC 5063 on the social media platform Twitter.

A smaller galaxy, called IC 5064, is located to the south of IC 5063. These two galaxies have a similar redshift and form a pair of galaxies.

== AGN ==
IC 5063 was studied with ESO and CTIO instruments in 1991. This showed that the system is a post-merger system and has an extended-emission line region (EELR) in the galaxy nucleus. EELRs usually show strong emission due to doubly-ionized oxygen [O III]. In this work for the first time the X-shape of the emission was noted. The first radio observation of the galaxy was published in 1998. This included radio continuum and H I region mapping with the Australia Telescope Compact Array. The radio emission is aligned with the emission by [O III]. The oxygen emission of [O III] was also imaged in higher resolution with Hubble WFPC2 and published in 2003. In 2021 VLT/MUSE observations were published, including IC 5063. This showed that the [O III] extends up to around 10 kpc on each side. Modelling has shown that the jet is expanding in a gaseous disk in the nucleus, destroying and displacing clouds in the central region.

Various other molecular and atomic emission lines associated with the outflow were detected with various telescopes. A molecular outflow was first detected in carbon monoxide (CO) in 2013 with the Atacama Pathfinder Experiment. The researchers suggested that the jet is accelerating molecules. In 2014 this was confirmed, by showing that the jet is accelerating hydrogen gas molecules (H_{2}) in a gaseous disk. This was based on spectroscopic observations with VLT/ISAAC. The researchers measured a speed of 600 km/s relative to the disk. More detailed observations with ALMA showed a fast outflow of cold gas imaged in carbon monoxide (CO). The entire jet has a size of 1 kpc and CO showed a speed of 650 km/s at 0.5 kpc. A later study, also using ALMA, found speeds of 800 km/s and a molecular outflow mass of more than 1.2 million M_{☉}. Near-infrared observations with VLT/SINFONI showed signatures of molecular and atomic gas that are distorted by the radio jet. The galaxy was observed with JWST MIRI. This observation has shown that the gas sometimes exceeds the local escape velocity. Bow shocks in H_{2} show that the entire jet is more extended than seen in radio. A giant loop of low ionized sulfur and nitrogen was observed perpendicular to the radio jet.

The crepuscular rays, extending more than 11 kpc, were discovered in 2020 with Hubble observations. These are located perpendicular to the emission line region and the radio jets. Bright rays in the middle of the dark regions might indicate gaps in the obscuring material. From the shape of the dark rays it was estimated that the AGN torus has a wide opening angle of ≥137°. The rays could also be explained by LINER-like outflows and bubbles that expand in a lateral direction, as is seen in one bubble in IC 5063.

== Gallery ==
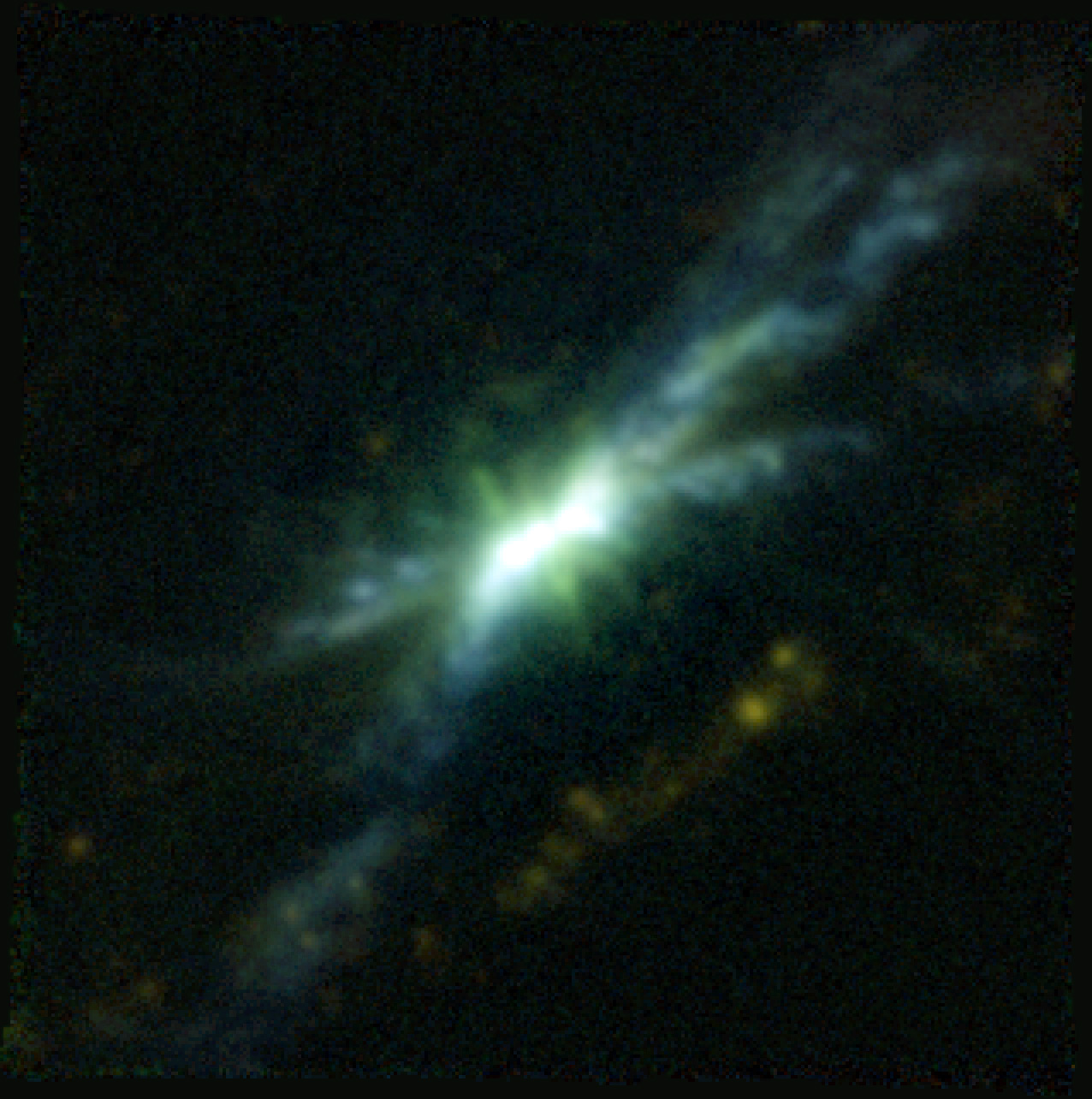
MUSE image of the X-shaped EELR and other emission features near the nucleus. Oxygen is blue, Hydrogen-alpha is orange, sulfur is green

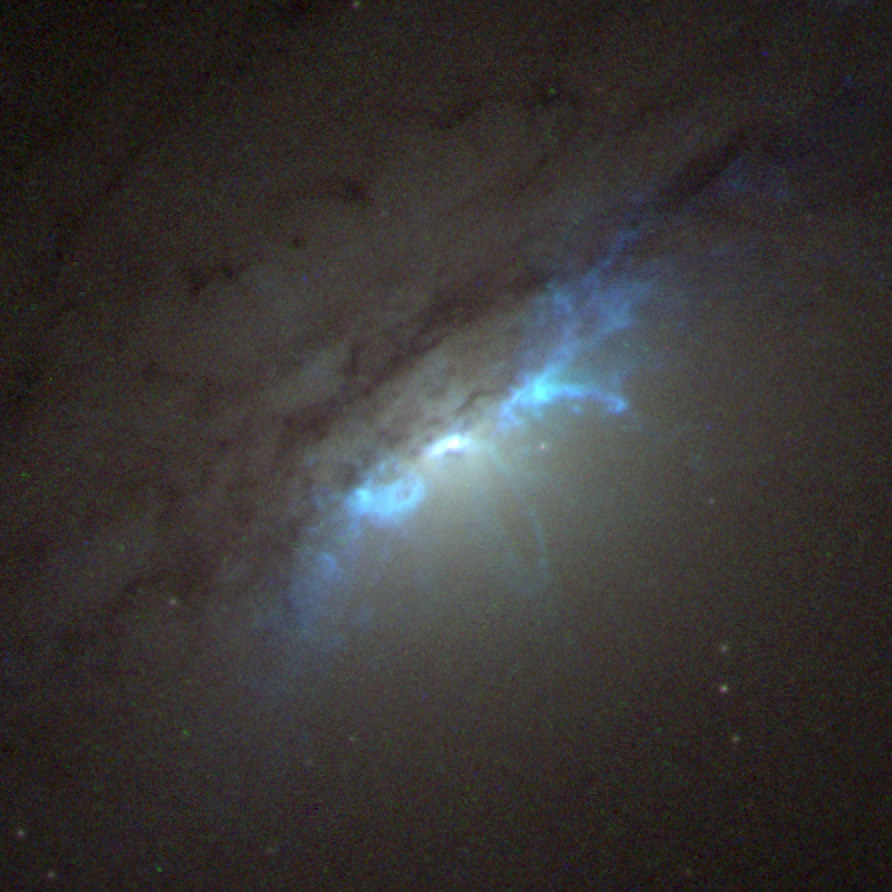
Hubble image of the EELR, with blue being H-alpha and nitrogen and green being sulfur. A faint giant loop is seen extending to the lower right, first discovered in 2021.

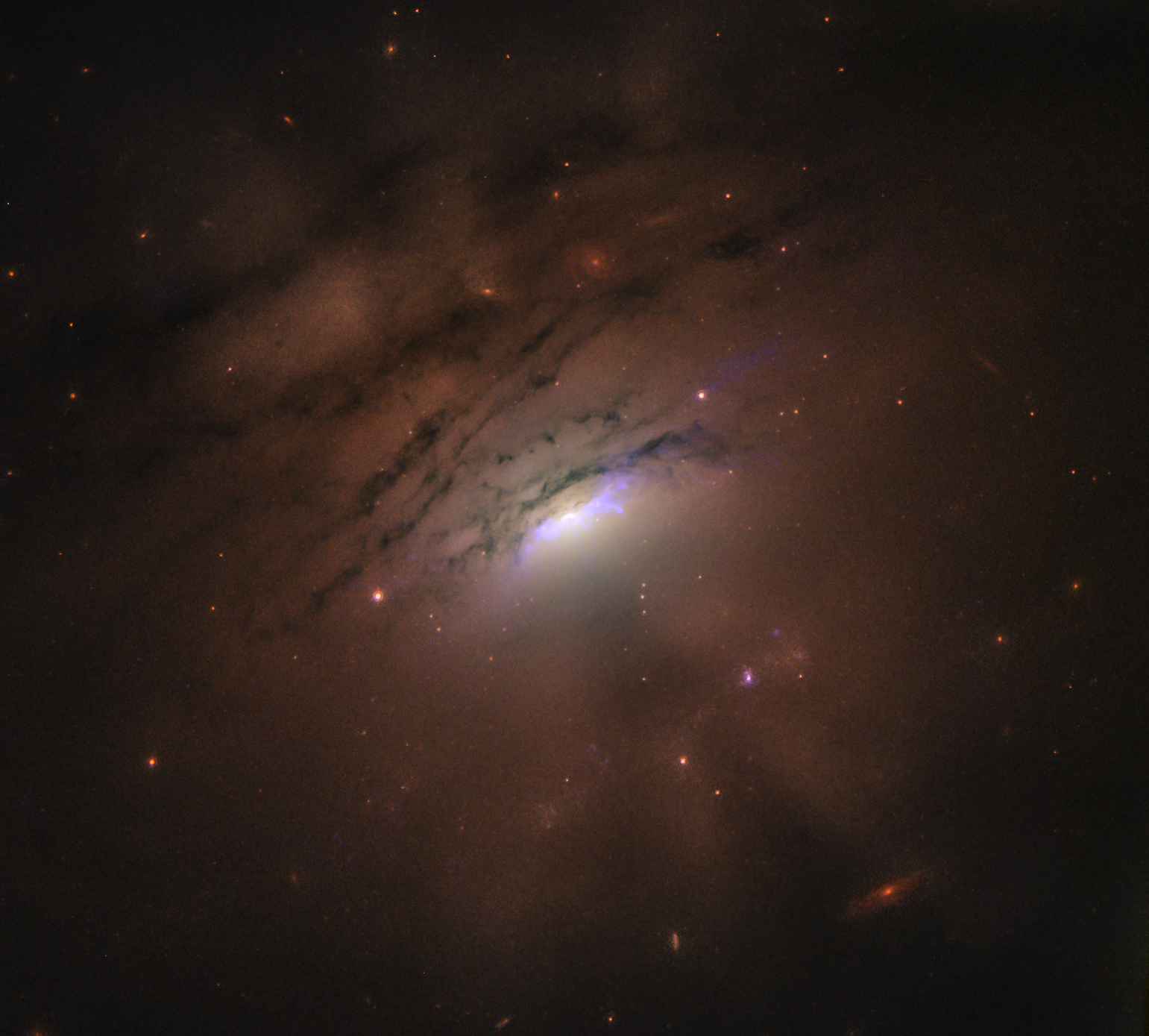
Hubble image showing both crepuscular rays and emission from the EELR in blue

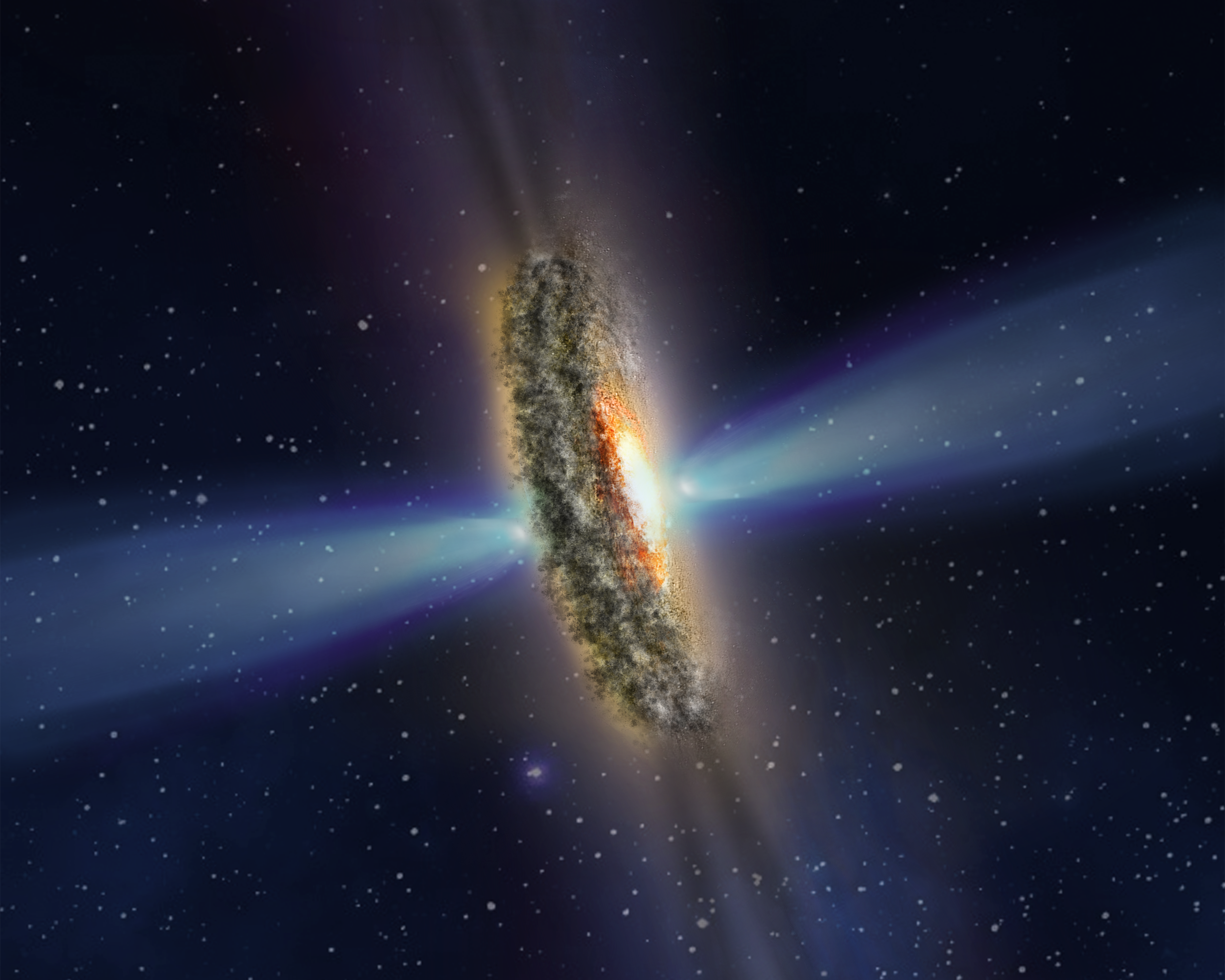
Artist's illustration depicting the explanation both the dark shadows and bright rays produced by a disk around the black hole
