= Calar Alto Legacy Integral Field Area Survey =

Astronomical galaxy-mapping project

- Alternative names: CALIFA
- Website: califa.caha.es

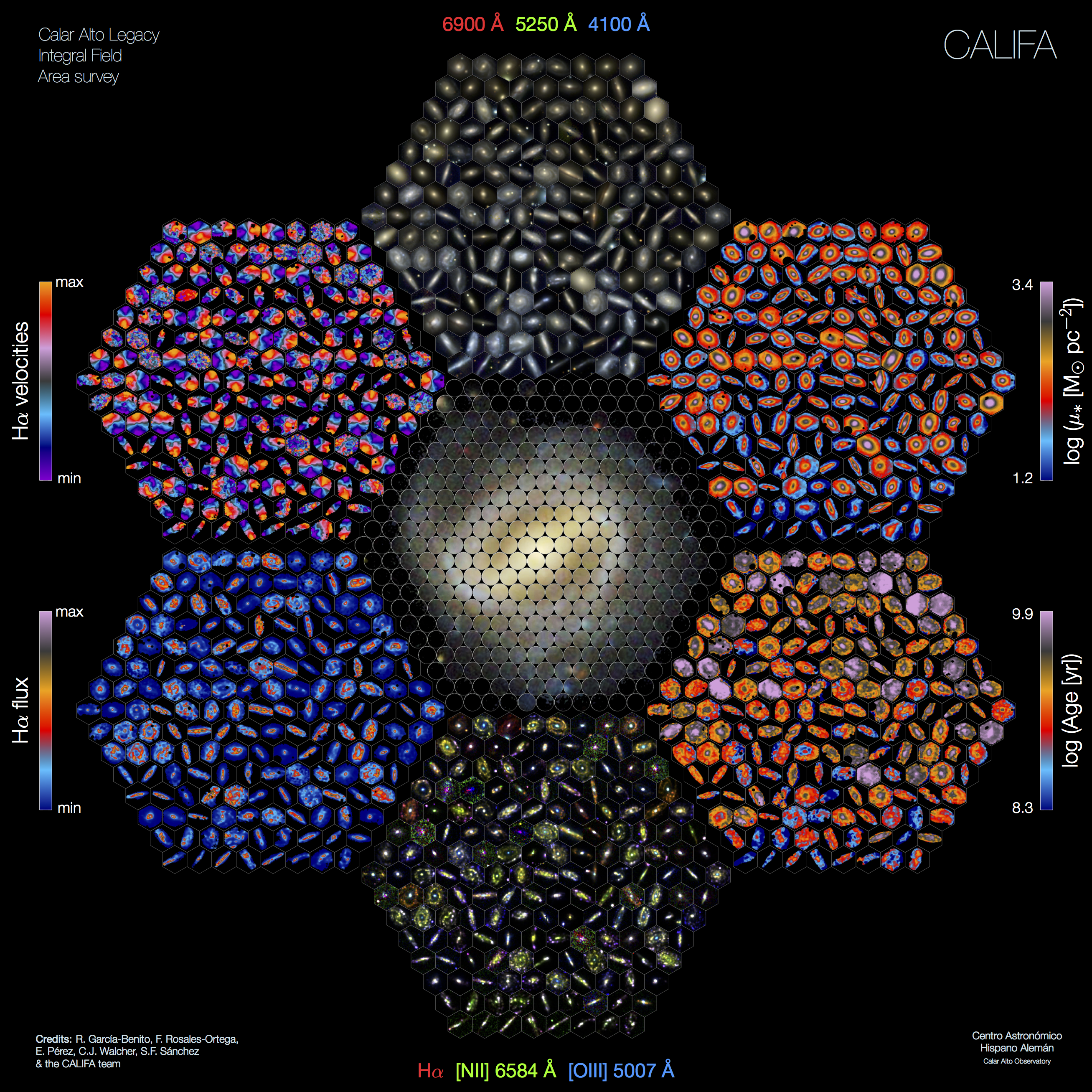
A composite of panels depicting maps of some of the properties of galaxies obtained from CALIFA data.

The CALIFA Survey (Calar Alto Legacy Integral Field Area Survey) is an astronomical project to map 600 galaxies with integral field spectroscopy (IFS), to allow detailed studies of these objects. The data are taken at the Calar Alto Observatory in Spain.

== Project ==
The CALIFA project addresses a number of open questions in galaxy evolution, among them:

1. The chemical evolution of galaxies: how, when, and where metals are produced in galaxies
2. Galaxy masses from different tracers: how much mass there is in stars, gas, and dark matter, and how it is distributed
3. Galaxy assembly as traced from the kinematic structure: what the motions of stars and gas tell us about the structure of the galaxies
4. Galaxy assembly as traced through the stellar population content: how, when, and where did stars form throughout the history of the galaxies

CALIFA data are made public through regular releases (DR). DR1, containing 200 data cubes of 100 galaxies, was released 1 November 2012. DR2, containing 400 data cubes of 200 galaxies, was released on 1 October 2014.
