= PlanetPol =

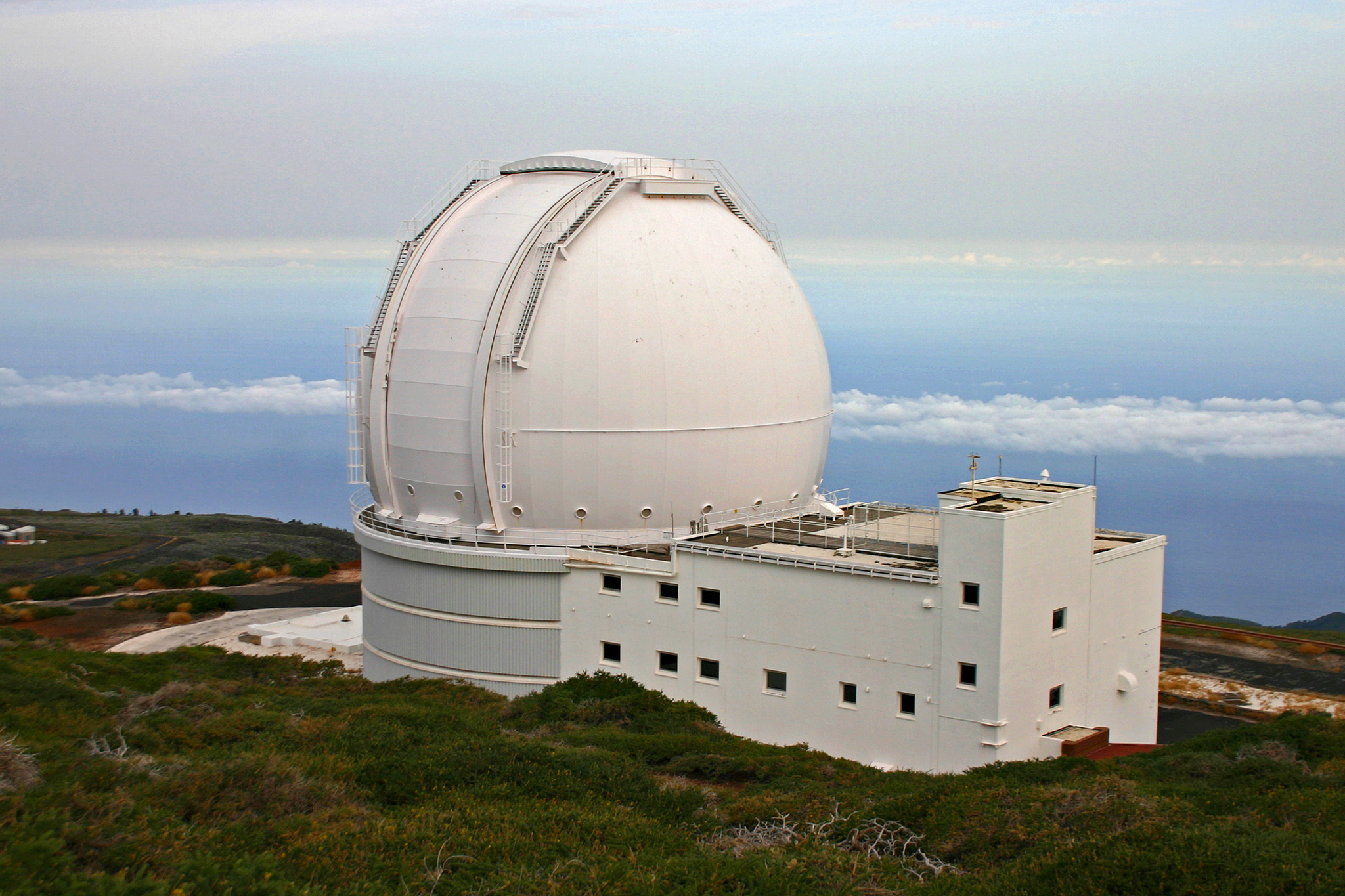
The William Herschel Telescope building

PlanetPol was a ground-based, high sensitivity polarimeter based at the William Herschel Telescope on the island of La Palma in the Canary Islands, Spain that has now been decommissioned. It was the most sensitive astronomical visual polarimeter ever built in fractional polarisation, a mantle that since its decommissioning now belongs to HIPPI. Although the device could be used for a wide range of astronomy, its primary use was the detection of extrasolar planets.

== Results ==
PlanetPol did not discover any extrasolar planets, however it was used to provide upper limits to planetary albedos in the known 55 Cnc and τ Boo planetary systems. Observations with the polarimeter in the Canary Islands, which are affected by dust from the Sahara, also identified airborne dust as a source of polarization within our atmosphere. Additionally, PlanetPol provided measurements of the polarization of a few dozen nearby stars, which were later combined with southern hemisphere measurements from PlanetPol's successor, HIPPI, to provide information about the nature of those stars and the distribution of the interstellar medium.
