= Galaxy H-Alpha Fabry-Perot System =

Astronomical instrument

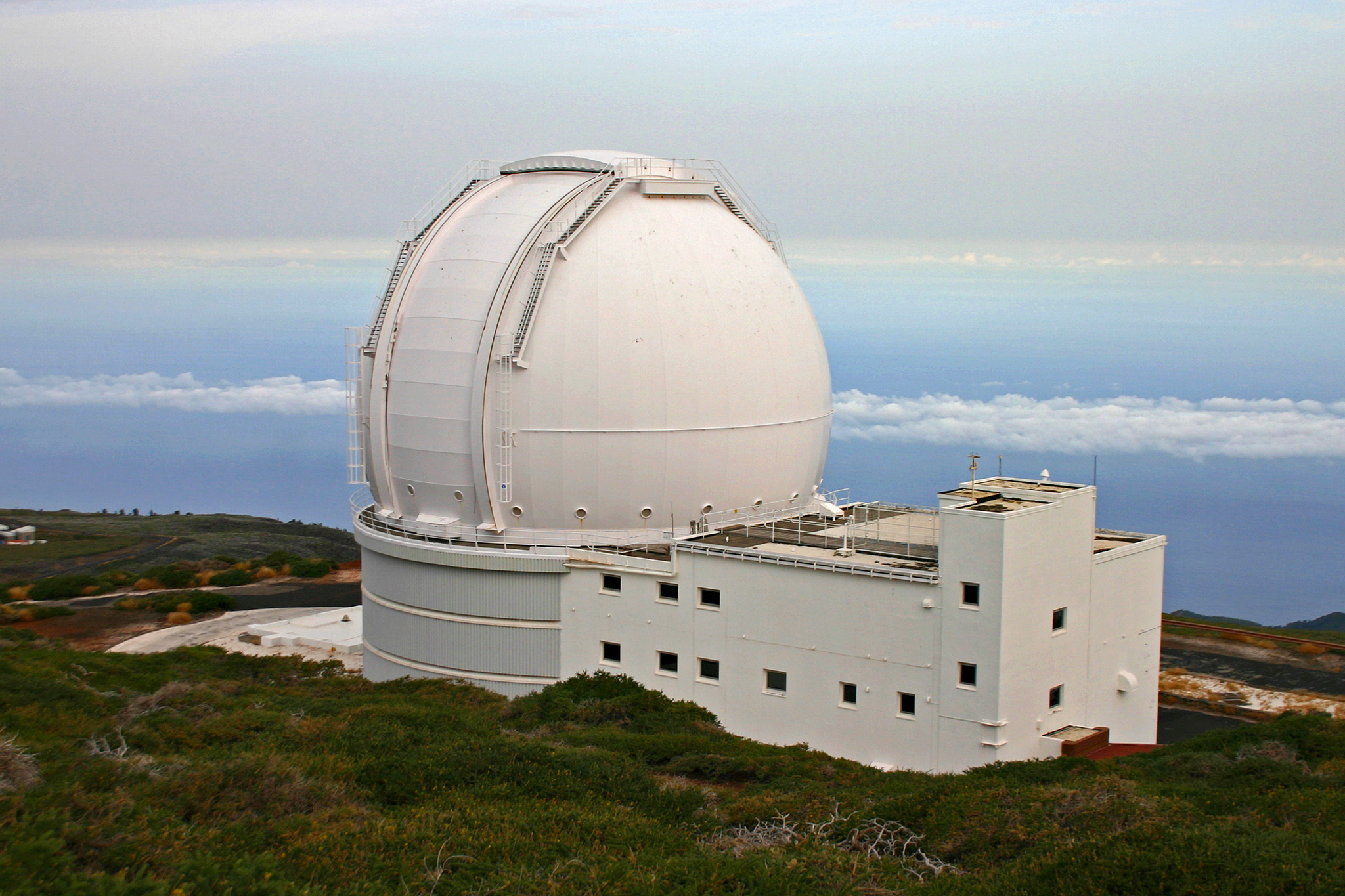
- The William Herschel Telescope where GHaFaS is working
- Alternative names: GHaFaS
- Location: Canary Islands, Spain
- Coordinates: 28°45′38″N 17°52′54″W
- Altitude: 2,344 m (7,690 ft)
- First light: 6 July 2007
- Website: www.astro.umontreal.ca/ghafas/Site/Bienvenue_-_Bienvenido_-_Welcome.html
- Location within Canary Islands

The Galaxy Hα Fabry-Perot System for WHT (GHaFaS) is an astronomical instrument installed on the 4.2 metre William Herschel Telescope (WHT) at Roque de los Muchachos Observatory on the Canary island of La Palma. First light was on 6 July 2007. Its name is a play on the acronym: Galaxy Hα Fabry-Perot System and the Spanish word "gafas" meaning spectacles. It produces maps, in intensity and velocity, of extended objects in the sky (which could be external galaxies, star forming regions in the Galaxy, planetary nebulae, or supernova remnants, as examples), which radiate in the H-alpha line, emitted by ionized hydrogen in interstellar space. It can also be used for a variety of other lines.

The possibility to detect the emission line of interstellar neutral hydrogen at 21 centimeters wavelength revolutionized astronomy in the second half of the 20th century, as a powerful tool to explore the structure and evolution of galaxies and the star formation within them. A second revolution came, when, at millimetre wavelengths, molecular hydrogen could be detected and measured directly using, above all, the emission from the lines of the CO molecule. Surprisingly, the emission from the third phase of interstellar hydrogen, the ionized phase, which is at optical wavelengths, has had less attention. The basic aim of GHaFaS is to make up for lost time by taking H-alpha velocity fields of galaxies at high spatial and spectral resolution.

The performance of GHaFaS is comparable to that of the largest radio telescope producing 21 cm maps in atomic hydrogen: the VLA. Over a field of 3.4 arcminutes in diameter, it produces a map of ionized hydrogen emission with a nominal velocity resolution of 5 km/s (11,000 mph) and an angular resolution limited by the "seeing" due to atmospheric turbulence of less than 1 arcsecond when used on the WHT. These values are similar to the best figures obtainable with the VLA. However, a good quality map can be obtained in half a night's observing with GHaFaS, which is considerably more time efficient than that on the VLA. Comparison with ALMA, the best system for observing molecular hydrogen, is not so easy. ALMA produces maps at considerably higher angular resolution, but over a much smaller field. Thus, at the moment GHaFaS is best suited to observing "local" galaxies, out of 100 Mpc (330,000,000 ly) distance, while ALMA is superior at intermediate and high redshift, in terms of angular and velocity resolutions.

GHaFaS is suited to exploring the details of the internal kinematics of galaxies, as well as phenomena related to the formation of high mass stars and their surroundings. It can be used to make measurements of the corotation radii of the density wave systems related to galaxy bars, and to explore the initial phases of the huge superbubbles caused by the combined stellar winds and supernovae of the OB associations of massive young stars.
