= International Fruit and Vegetable Juice Association =

The International Fruit and Vegetable Juice Association (IFU) represents the worldwide juice sector interests as the registered non-governmental organization (NGO) at Codex Alimentarius. It also represents the sector with World Health Organization (WHO), World Trade Organization (WTO), World Customs Organization (WCO) and any other relevant governmental or intergovernmental organisation.

== Overview ==
The IFU was founded in Paris in 1949 as the International Federation of Fruit Juice Producers named International Fruit Juice Union. The name of the organisation was changed in 2015 to International Fruit and Vegetable Juice Association to reflect the diversity of the membership base. Today it is represented in 77 member countries across 6 continents.

IFU acts as an information and communication centre/facilitator, harmonizes standards and practices for juice containing products and its supply chain, co-ordinates scientific activities to benefit the juice sector and is the accepted forum for discussion on international juice related matters.

== Structure ==
The highest body of the IFU is the Assembly of Delegates. The Executive Committee is responsible for the association and is composed of a President, Vice-President, Past President, Treasurer, 7 committee members and 4 commission chairs.

- Executive Director – John Collins
- President – Kees Cools
- Vice-President – Demir Sarman
- Treasurer – Peter Gates
- Past President – Dirk Lansbergen

== Commissions ==
The Legislation Commission, chaired by Dr David Hammond, represents the worldwide Juice Sector interests as an NGO at government and international organisations. It acts as a regulatory information centre and supports harmonisation of international regulatory standards and practices across the juice sector.

The Methods of Analysis Commission, chaired by Mikko Hofsommer of GfL in Berlin, has as its primary mission to create and standardise methods of analysis, specifically for processed fruit and vegetable products. Most of the published IFU methods are listed as official methods in codex.

The Microbiology working group, chaired by Andreas Politzer and ADM, is a subgroup of the Methods of Analysis Commission. It focuses on similar issues within their field.

The Science and Technology Commission, chaired by Mario Gozzi of CFT in Italy, facilitates discussion and the exchange of information between IFU members on scientific and technical issues relating to the global juice based beverage industry and to provide counsel to the IFU organisation on scientific and technical matters.

The Marketing Commission, chaired by Margarita Maier of Storyhaus in Austria, ensures the continued growth of the association by promoting its activities and those of the international juice industry. It co-ordinates and executes the planning of IFU conferences, workshops and roadshows. It also establishes a communication network for members and other relevant non-member organisations to mutually share information.

The Nutrition Working Group acts as an expert group to IFU on the topic of nutrition science in relation to fruit and vegetable juices, providing advice and texts on the subject. It aims to continue the development of the IFU nutrition network globally (with associations, institutions and experts) and IFU health & nutrition positions and publications.

The Sustainability Working Group, chaired by David Berryman, provides a framework for actions leading to best practices and supports a certified sustainable juice supply chain. It offers a harmonised framework for commitment, guidance, information and communication. It supports globalisation and cooperation with other initiatives and provides an information platform for IFU members on the current status in the global juice industry.
