= William Herschel Telescope =

Telescope in La Palma, Spain

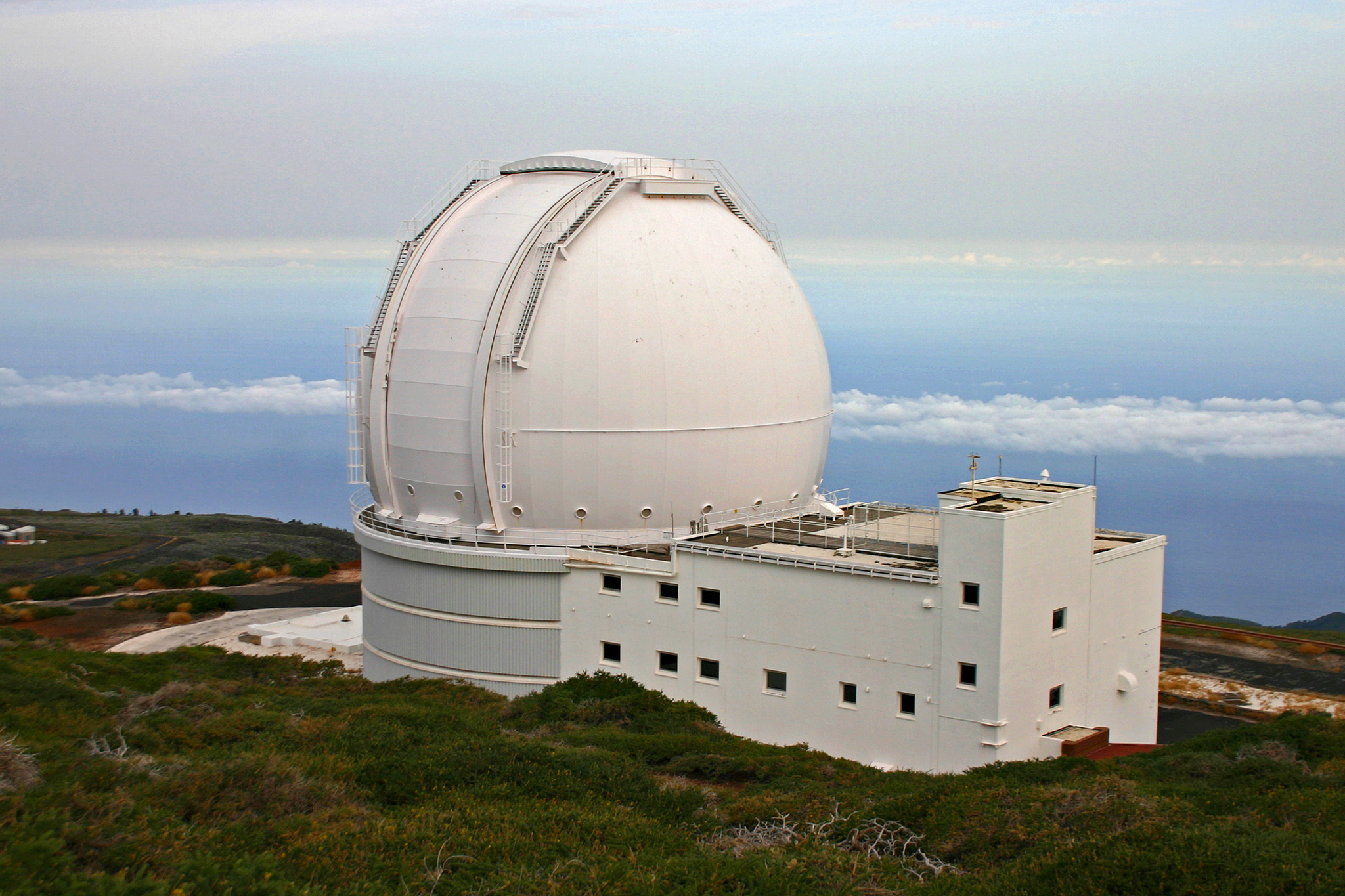
- The William Herschel Telescope building
- Alternative names: WHT
- Location: Province of Santa Cruz de Tenerife, Canary Islands, Spain
- Coordinates: 28°45′38″N 17°52′54″W
- Altitude: 2,344 m (7,690 ft)
- Diameter: 4.2 m (13 ft 9 in)
- Secondary diameter: 1.0 m (3 ft 3 in)
- Collecting area: 13.8 m^{2} (149 sq ft)
- Website: www.ing.iac.es//Astronomy/telescopes/wht/
- Location within Canary Islands
- Related media on Commons

The William Herschel Telescope (WHT) is a 4.20-metre (165 in) optical and near-infrared reflecting telescope located at the Roque de los Muchachos Observatory on the island of La Palma in the Canary Islands, Spain. The telescope, which is named after William Herschel, the discoverer of the planet Uranus, is part of the Isaac Newton Group of Telescopes. It is funded by research councils from the United Kingdom, the Netherlands and Spain.

At the time of construction in 1987, the WHT was the third largest single optical telescope in the world. (Note: The BTA-6 (6.0 m) and Hale Telescope (5.1 m) were both larger; the Multiple Mirror Telescope also had a larger collecting area but did not have a single primary mirror) It is currently the second largest in Europe, (Note: The neighbouring Gran Telescopio Canarias (10.4 m) overtook the WHT in 2009 to become the largest in Europe) and was the last telescope constructed by Grubb Parsons in their 150-year history.

The WHT is equipped with a wide range of instruments operating over the optical and near-infrared regimes. These are used by professional astronomers to conduct a wide range of astronomical research. Astronomers using the telescope discovered the first evidence for a supermassive black hole (Sgr A*) at the centre of the Milky Way, and made the first optical observation of a gamma-ray burst. The telescope has 75% clear nights, with a median seeing of 0.7".

== History ==
The WHT was first conceived in the late 1960s, when the 3.9 m (150 in) Anglo-Australian Telescope (AAT) was being designed. The British astronomical community saw the need for telescopes of comparable power in the Northern Hemisphere. In particular, there was a need for optical follow-up of interesting sources in the radio surveys being conducted at the Jodrell Bank and Mullard observatories (both located in the UK), which could not be done from the Southern Hemisphere location of the AAT.

The AAT was completed in 1974, at which point the British Science and Engineering Research Council began planning for a group of three telescopes located in the Northern Hemisphere (now known as the Isaac Newton Group of Telescopes, ING). The telescopes were to be a 1.0 m (39 in) (which became the Jacobus Kapteyn Telescope), the 2.5 m (98 in) Isaac Newton Telescope which was to be moved from its existing site at Herstmonceux Castle, and a 4m class telescope, initially planned as a 4.5 m (180 in). A new site was chosen at an altitude of 2,344 m (7,690 ft) on the island of La Palma in the Canary Islands, which is now the Roque de los Muchachos Observatory. The project was led by the Royal Greenwich Observatory (RGO), who also operated the telescopes until control passed to an independent ING when the RGO closed in 1998.

By 1979 the 4 m was on the verge of being scrapped due to a ballooning budget, whilst the aperture had been reduced to 4.2 m (170 in). A panel known as the Tiger Team was convened to reduce the cost; a re-design cut the price-tag by 45%. (Note: From £18M to £10M, at 1979 values) Savings were primarily made by reducing the focal length of the telescope – which allowed the use of a smaller dome – and relocating non-essential functions outside the dome to a simpler (and thus cheaper) rectangular annexe. In the same year, the Isaac Newton Telescope was moved to Roque de los Muchachos Observatory, becoming the first of the Isaac Newton Group of Telescopes. In 1981 the Nederlandse Organisatie voor Wetenschappelijk Onderzoek (Netherlands Organization for Scientific Research, NWO) bought a 20% stake in the project, allowing the WHT to be given the go-ahead. That year was the 200th anniversary of the discovery of Uranus by William Herschel, so it was decided to name the telescope in his honour.

Construction of the telescope was by Grubb Parsons, the last telescope that company produced in its 150-year history. Work began at their factory in Newcastle upon Tyne in 1983, and the telescope was shipped to La Palma in 1985 (the two other telescopes of the Isaac Newton Group began operating in 1984). The WHT saw first light on 1 June 1987; it was the third largest optical telescope in the world at the time. The total cost of the telescope, including the dome and the full initial suite of instruments, was £15M (in 1984, equivalent to £49M in 2025); within budget once inflation is taken into account. (Note: The budget of £10M set in 1979 was equivalent to £15.1M in 1984, due to high inflation during the early 1980s recession.)

== Design ==
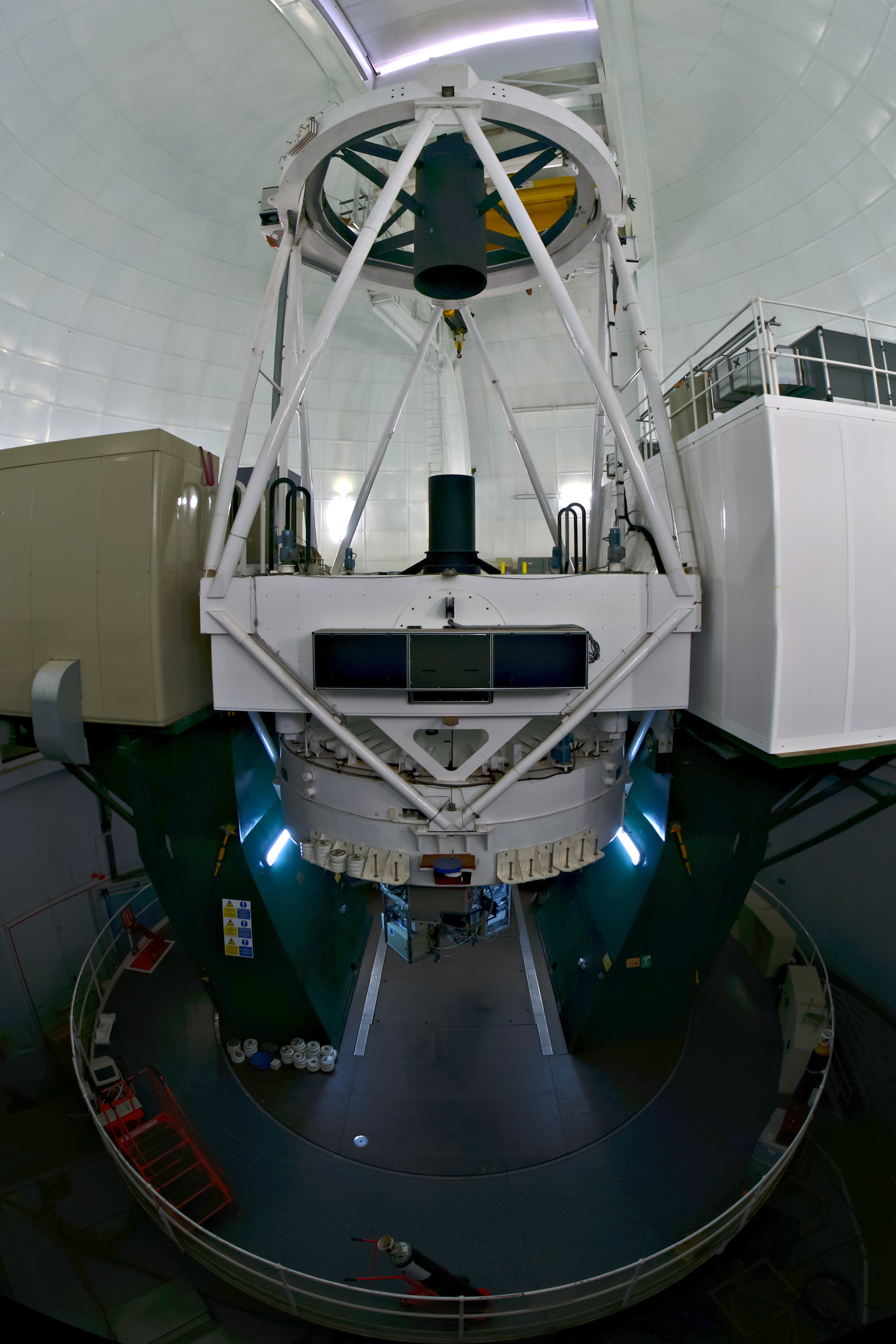
The William Herschel Telescope inside its dome. The two black tubes are light baffles, the two large enclosures on the left and right are the Nasmyth platforms, instruments at the Cassegrain focus are visible at the base, and the three black boxes in the centre house the calibration lamps located at folded Cassegrain.

=== Optics ===
The telescope consists of a 4.20 m (165 in) f/2.5 primary mirror made by Owens-Illinois from Cervit, a zero-expansion glass-ceramic material, and ground by Grubb Parsons. The mirror blank was produced in 1969 as one of a set of four, along with those for the AAT, CFHT and Blanco telescopes, and was purchased for the WHT in 1979, ten years after it was made. The primary is solid and un-thinned, so no active optics system is required, despite its weight of 16.5 tonnes (16.2 long tons). The mirror support cell holds the main mirror on a set of 60 pneumatic cylinders. Even under the most extreme loading (with the telescope pointing at the horizon, so the mirror is vertical) the shape of the mirror changes by only 50 nanometres (2.0×10^{−6} in); during normal operation the deformation is much smaller.

In its most usual configuration, a 1.00 m (39 in) hyperbolic secondary mirror made of Zerodur is used to form a Ritchey Chretien f/11 Cassegrain system with a 15 arcmin field of view. An additional flat fold mirror allows the use of any one of two Nasmyth platforms or two folded Cassegrain stations, each with 5 arcmin fields of view. The telescope sometimes operates in a wide-field prime focus configuration, in which case the secondary is removed and a three element field-correcting lens inserted, which provides an effective f/2.8 focus with a 60 arcmin field of view (40 arcmin unvignetted). Changing between the Cassegrain and Nasmyth foci takes a matter of seconds and may be done during the night; switching to and from prime focus requires replacing the secondary mirror with a prime focus assembly during daytime (the two are mounted back-to-back) which takes around 30 minutes.

A Coudé focus was planned as a later addition, to feed an optical interferometer with another telescope, but this was never built. A chopping f/35 secondary mirror was planned for infrared observations, but was placed on hold by the cost-saving re-design and never implemented.

=== Mount ===
The optical system weighs 79,513 kg (78.257 long tons) and is manoeuvred on an alt-azimuth mount, with a total moving mass of 186,250 kg (183.31 long tons) (plus instruments). The BTA-6 and Multi Mirror Telescope had demonstrated during the 1970s the significant weight (and therefore cost) savings which could be achieved by the alt-azimuth design compared to the traditional equatorial mount for large telescopes. However, the alt-azimuth design requires continuous computer control, compensation for field rotation at each focus, and results in a 0.2 degree radius blind spot at the zenith where the drive motors cannot keep up with sidereal motion (the drives have a maximum speed of one degree per second in each axis). The mount is so smooth and finely balanced that before the drive motors were installed it was possible to move the then 160 long tons (160,000 kg) assembly by hand. During closed loop guiding, the mount is capable of an absolute pointing accuracy of 0.03 arcseconds.

=== Dome ===
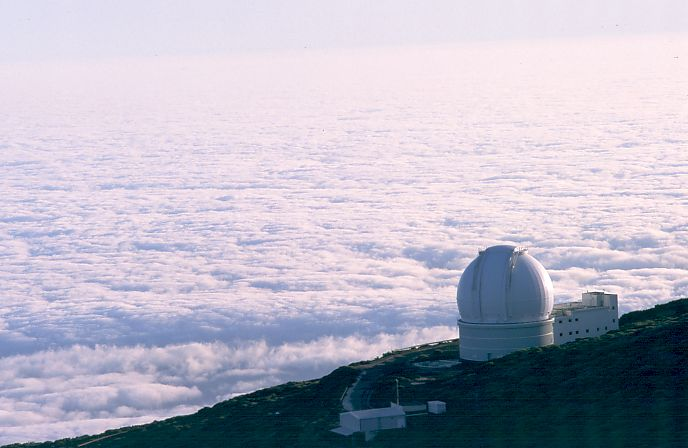
The WHT dome above a sea of clouds

The telescope is housed in an onion-shaped steel dome with an internal diameter of 21 m (69 ft), manufactured by Brittain Steel. The telescope mount is located on a cylindrical concrete pier so that the centre of rotation is 13.4 m (44 ft) above ground level, which lifts the telescope above ground-layer air turbulence for better seeing. A conventional up-down 6m-wide shutter with wind-blind, several large vents with extractor fans for thermal control, and a 35-tonne (34-long-ton) capacity crane (used for moving the primary mirror e.g. for aluminising) are all incorporated. The size and shape of the shutter allow observations down to 12° above the horizon, which corresponds to an airmass of 4.8. The total moving mass of the dome is 320 tonnes (310 long tons), which is mounted on top of a three-storey cylindrical building. The dome was designed to minimise wind stresses and can support up to its own weight again in ice during inclement weather. The dome and telescope rest on separate sets of foundations (driven 20 metres (66 ft) down into the volcanic basalt), to prevent vibrations caused by dome rotation or wind stresses on the building affecting the telescope pointing.

Attached to the dome is a three-storey rectangular building which houses the telescope control room, computer room, kitchen etc. Almost no human presence is required inside the dome, which means the environmental conditions can be kept very stable. As a result, the WHT obtains perfect dome seeing. This building also houses a detector laboratory and a realuminising plant. Because the WHT has the largest single mirror at the Roque de los Muchachos Observatory, its realuminising plant has a vacuum vessel large enough to accommodate the mirrors from any other telescope on the mountain. As a result, all of the other telescopes at the observatory contract to use the WHT plant for their realuminising (with the exception of the Gran Telescopio Canarias, which has its own plant).

== Operations ==
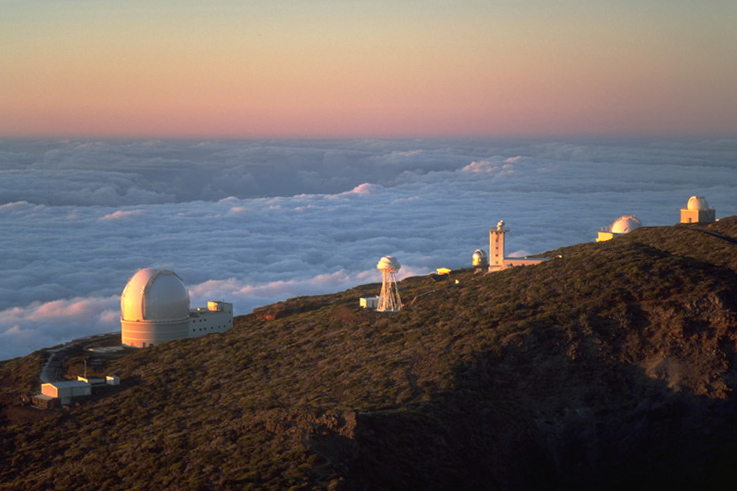
Part of Roque de los Muchachos Observatory, including the Isaac Newton Group of Telescopes. The William Herschel Telescope is the large dome on the left, the Isaac Newton Telescope is located second from the right, and the Jacobus Kapteyn Telescope is located on the far right.

The WHT is operated by the Isaac Newton Group of Telescopes (ING), together with the 2.5m Isaac Newton Telescope and 1.0m Jacobus Kapteyn Telescope. Offices and administration are located an hour's drive away in Santa Cruz de La Palma, the island's capital. Funding is provided by the UK's Science and Technology Facilities Council (STFC, 65%), the Netherlands' Nederlandse Organisatie voor Wetenschappelijk Onderzoek (NWO, 25%) and Spain's Instituto de Astrofísica de Canarias (IAC, 10%) (2008 values). Telescope time is distributed in proportion to this funding, although Spain receives an additional 20% allocation in return for use of the observatory site. Five percent of observing time is further reserved for astronomers of other nationalities. As a competitive research telescope, the WHT is heavily oversubscribed, typically receiving applications for three to four times as much observing time as is actually available.

The vast majority of observations are carried out in visitor mode i.e. with the investigating astronomer physically present at the telescope. A shift to service mode operations (those carried out by observatory staff on behalf of astronomers who do not travel to the telescope) has been considered and rejected on scientific and operational grounds.

== Instruments ==
The WHT is equipped with a wide range of scientific instruments, providing a range of capabilities to astronomers. As of 2022, the common-user instrumentation is:

ACAM
Auxiliary-port CAMera – optical imager/spectrograph, with broad- and narrow-band imaging over an 8' field and low-resolution (R < 900) spectroscopy. Permanently mounted at one of the broken-Cassegrain foci.

ISIS
Intermediate dispersion Spectrograph and Imaging System – medium resolution (R = 1,800-20,000) long-slit dual-beam optical spectrograph. Mounted at Cassegrain focus. ISIS was one of the original first generation of WHT instruments.

LIRIS
Long-slit Intermediate Resolution Infrared Spectrograph – near-infrared imager/spectrograph, with imaging over a 4' field, spectral resolutions R = 700–2500, spectropolarimetry, and long slit and multi-object slit-masks. Mounted at Cassegrain focus.

WEAVE
WHT Enhanced Area Velocity Explorer - a multi-object optical spectrograph, which uses a robot positioner and optical fibres to observe up to 1000 targets at a time.

Beginning in 2022, 70% of the telescope's time will be dedicated to surveys with WEAVE. Prior to the installation of WEAVE (2020-22), ISIS and LIRIS were the workhorses of the WHT, with approximately two-thirds of all time awarded using those two instruments.

In addition the WHT is a popular telescope for single-purpose visitor instruments, which in recent years have included PAUCam, GHαFaS, PNS, INTEGRAL, PLANETPOL, SAURON, FASTCAM and ULTRACAM. Visitor instruments can use either the Cassegrain focus or one of the Nasmyth foci.

A common set of calibration lamps (Helium and Neon arc lamps, and a Tungsten flat-field lamp) are permanently mounted at one of the broken-Cassegrain foci, and can be used for any of the other instruments.

== Scientific research ==
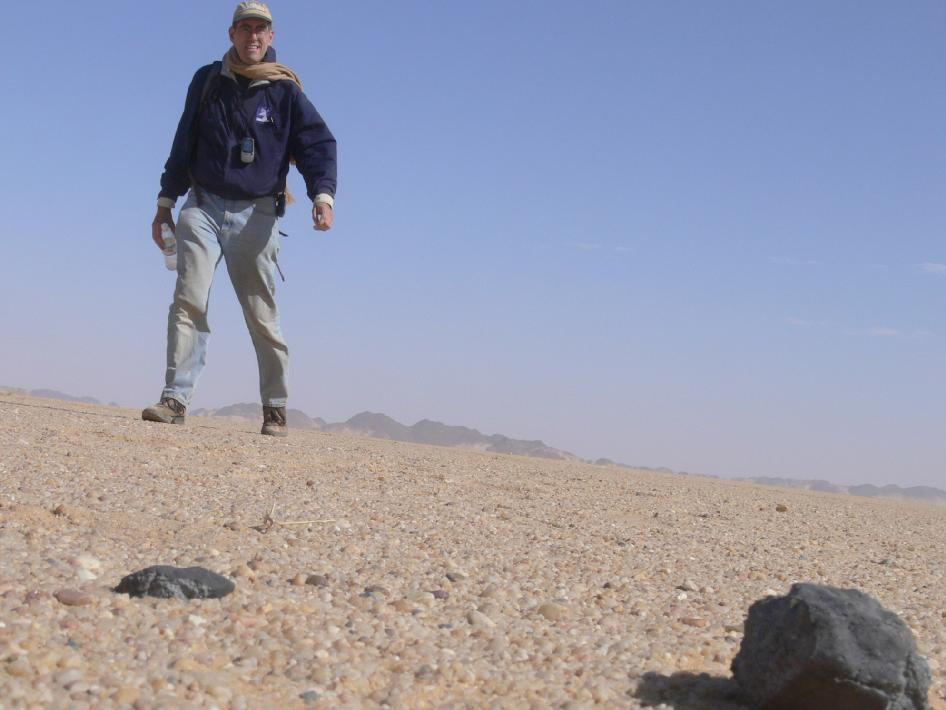
The Dutch-American astronomer Peter Jenniskens in the Nubian Desert with a fragment of 2008 TC3, an asteroid observed by the WHT just days earlier

Astronomers use the WHT to conduct scientific research across most branches of observational astronomy, including Solar System science, galactic astronomy, extragalactic astronomy and cosmology. Most of the instruments are designed to be useful for a range of different research.

The WHT has been used to make many significant new discoveries. Some of the more notable include the first evidence of a supermassive black hole (Sgr A*) at the centre of the Milky Way (in 1995) and the first optical observation of a gamma-ray burst (GRB 970228) (in 1997).

Since the mid-1990s the WHT has faced increasing competition from newer 8-to-10 m (310-to-390 in) telescopes. Nevertheless, a wide range of research continues to be done with the telescope. In recent years (as of 2010) this has included:

- The SAURON project, an integral field spectrograph survey of nearby elliptical and lenticular galaxies (2001–2010)
- The first spectrum of an asteroid which subsequently hit Earth, 2008 TC3 (2009)
- The first spectrum of Hanny's Voorwerp (2009)
- The discovery that diffuse interstellar bands do not originate in circumstellar envelopes (2008)
- Confirmation that WASP-3b is an extrasolar planet (2008)
- High-resolution spectra of the first known double supernova, SN 2006jc (2007)

== Future developments ==
The upcoming generation of extremely large telescopes (ELTs) will require sophisticated adaptive optics in order to be used to their full capability. Because the WHT had an advanced adaptive optics system operating, it has received attention from the various ELT programs. As of 2010, the European Southern Observatory's European-ELT (E-ELT) project had a programme to utilise the WHT as a test-bed for its adaptive optics system, and received several nights per year for on-sky testing. The project involves construction of new optical experiments at one of the Nasmyth foci, and is called CANARY. CANARY will demonstrate the multi-object adaptive optics (MOAO) required for the EAGLE instrument on the E-ELT.

The UK's STFC (originally the major financial contributor) has gradually reduced its funding for the ING telescopes over a number of years. Some of this funding shortfall has been made up by other partners increasing their contributions, and some by efficiency savings and cutbacks. As a result, the shares of observing time will become UK 33%, Netherlands 28%, Spain 34% and 5% for any nationality. A new development, started in 2010, is the development of a new wide-field multi-object spectroscopy facility (WEAVE), being developed by a UK-led consortium involving major contributions from the Netherlands, Spain, France, and Italy, the final installation of which was confirmed in August 2022. WEAVE will provide medium-high resolution spectroscopy in the visible (360–950 nm) range for up to 1000 simultaneous targets over a 2 degree field of view, and is currently expected to operate for several years.

== See also ==
- List of largest optical reflecting telescopes
