= Integral field spectrograph =

Spectrograph equipped with an integral field unit

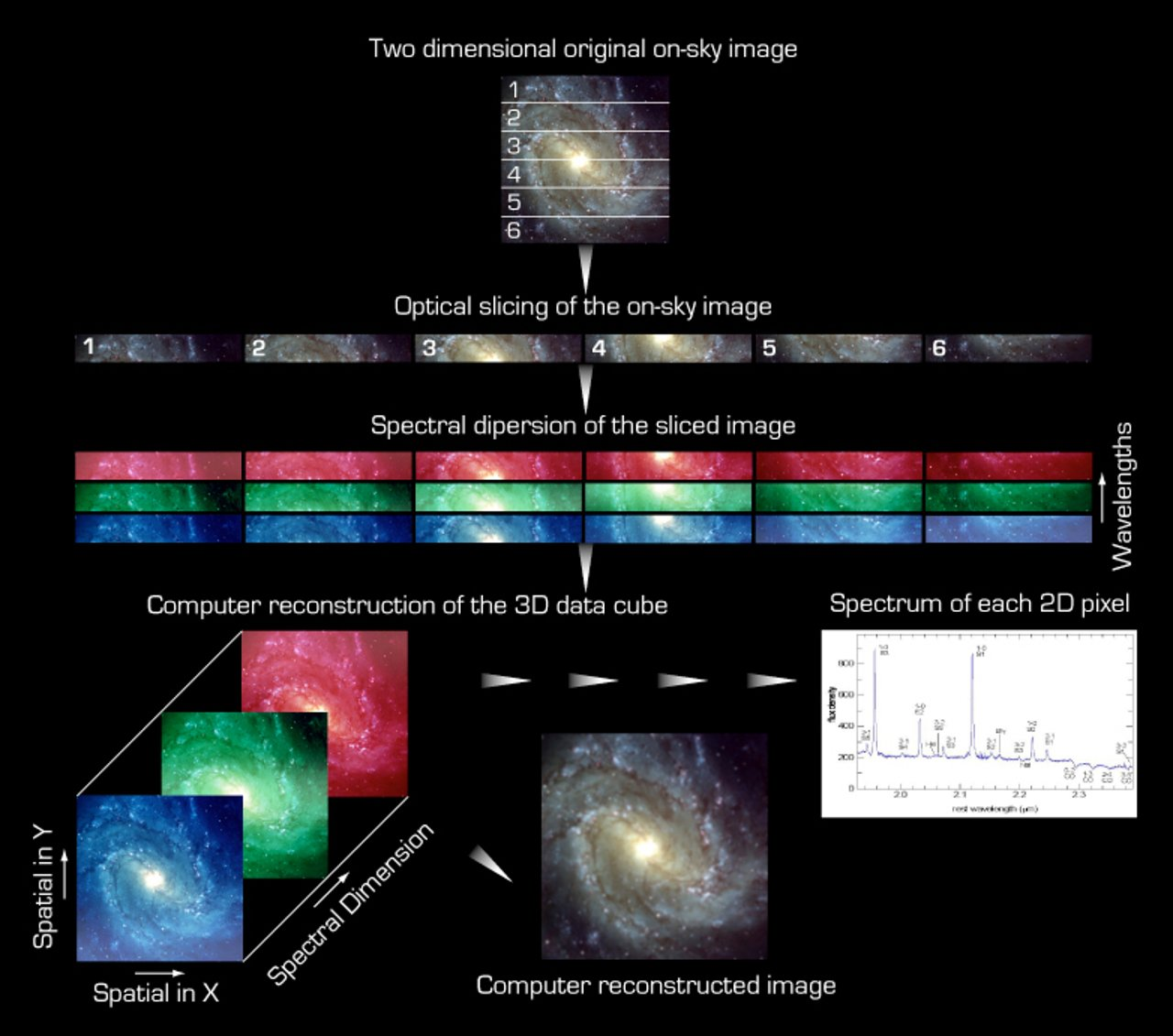
An example of an Integral Field Spectroscopy technique, slicing the scene with mirrors.

Integral field spectrographs (IFS) combine spectrographic and imaging capabilities in the optical or infrared wavelength domains (0.32 μm – 24 μm) to get from a single exposure spatially resolved spectra in a bi-dimensional region. The name originates from the fact that the measurements result from integrating the light on multiple sub-regions of the field. Developed at first for the study of astronomical objects, this technique is now also used in many other fields, such as bio-medical science and Earth remote sensing. Integral field spectrography is part of the broader category of snapshot hyperspectral imaging techniques, itself a part of hyperspectral imaging.

== Rationale ==
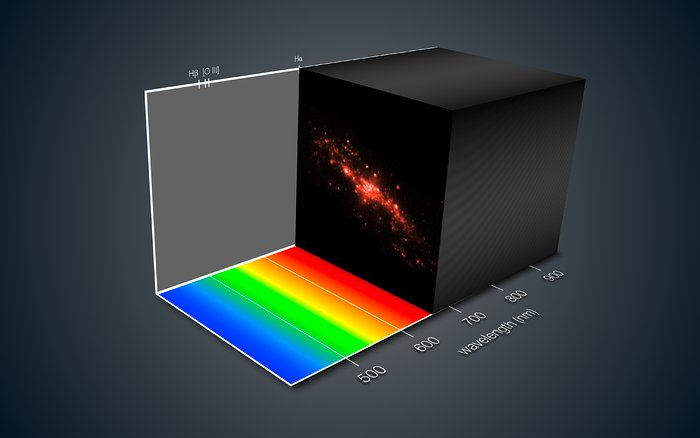
Cut of a datacube describing a galaxy.

With the notable exception of individual stars, most astronomical objects are spatially resolved by large telescopes. For spectroscopic studies, the optimum would then be to get a spectrum for each spatial pixel in the instrument field of view, getting full information on each target. This is loosely called a datacube from its two spatial and one spectral dimensions. Since both visible charge-coupled devices (CCD) and infrared detector arrays (staring arrays) used for astronomical instruments are bi-dimensional only, it is a non-trivial feat to develop spectrographic systems able to deliver 3D data cubes from the output of 2D detectors. Such instruments are usually christened 3D spectrographs in the astronomical field and hyperspectral imagers in the non-astronomical ones.

Hyperspectral imagers can be broadly classified in two groups, scanning and non-scanning. The first contains the instruments that build the datacube by combining multiple exposures, scanning along a space axis, a wavelength axis or diagonally through it. Examples include push broom scanning systems, scanning Fabry-Perot and Fourier transform spectrometers. The second group includes the techniques that acquire the whole datacube in a single shot, snapshot imaging spectrometers. Integral field spectrography (IFS) techniques were the first snapshot hyperspectral imaging techniques to be developed. Since then, other snapshot hyperspectral imaging techniques, based for example on tomographic reconstruction or compressed sensing using a coded aperture, have been developed.

One major advantage of the snapshot approach for ground-based telescopic observations is that it automatically provides homogenous data sets despite the unavoidable variability of Earth’s atmospheric transmission, spectral emission and image blurring during exposures. This is not the case for scanned systems for which the data cubes are built by a set of successive exposures. IFS, whether ground or space based, have also the huge advantage to detect much fainter objects in a given exposure than scanning systems, if at the cost of a much smaller sky field area.

After a slow start from the late 1980s on, Integral field spectroscopy has become a mainstream astrophysical tool in the optical to mid-infrared regions, addressing a whole gamut of astronomical sources, essentially any smallish individual object from Solar System asteroids to vastly distant galaxies.

== Methods ==
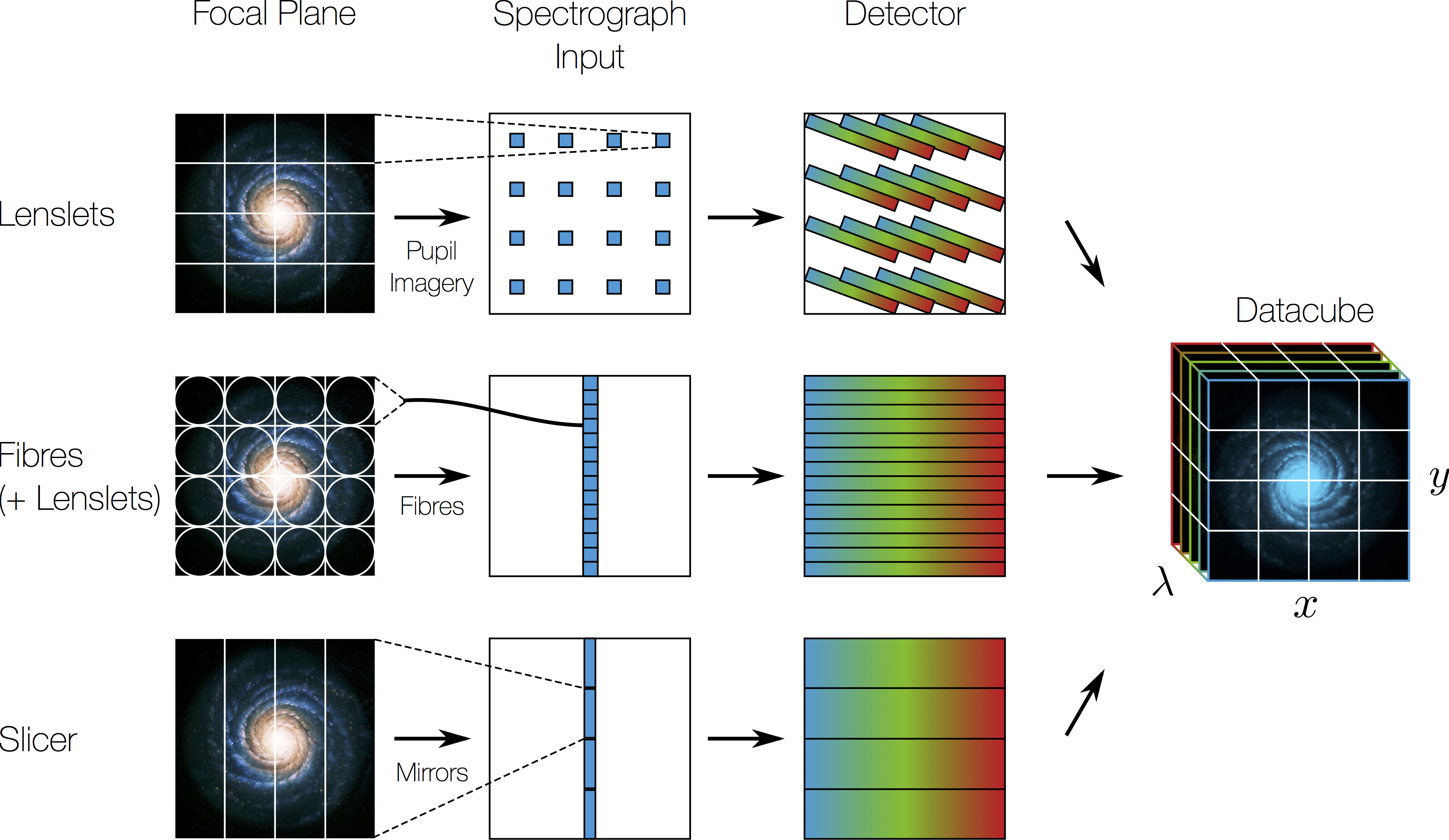
The three techniques used by integral field spectrographs, using lenslet arrays, bundles of optical fibres (possibly with lenslets) or slicing mirrors.

Integral field spectrographs use so-called Integral Field Units (IFUs) to reformat incoming light from a small field of view, typically rectangular or hexagonal, into a more suitable shape. This reformatted image can then be spectrally dispersed onto a detector by a diffraction grating, such that none of the spectra of each spatial element overlap. There are currently three different IFU flavors, using respectively a lenslet array, a fiber array or a mirror array.

=== Lenslet array ===
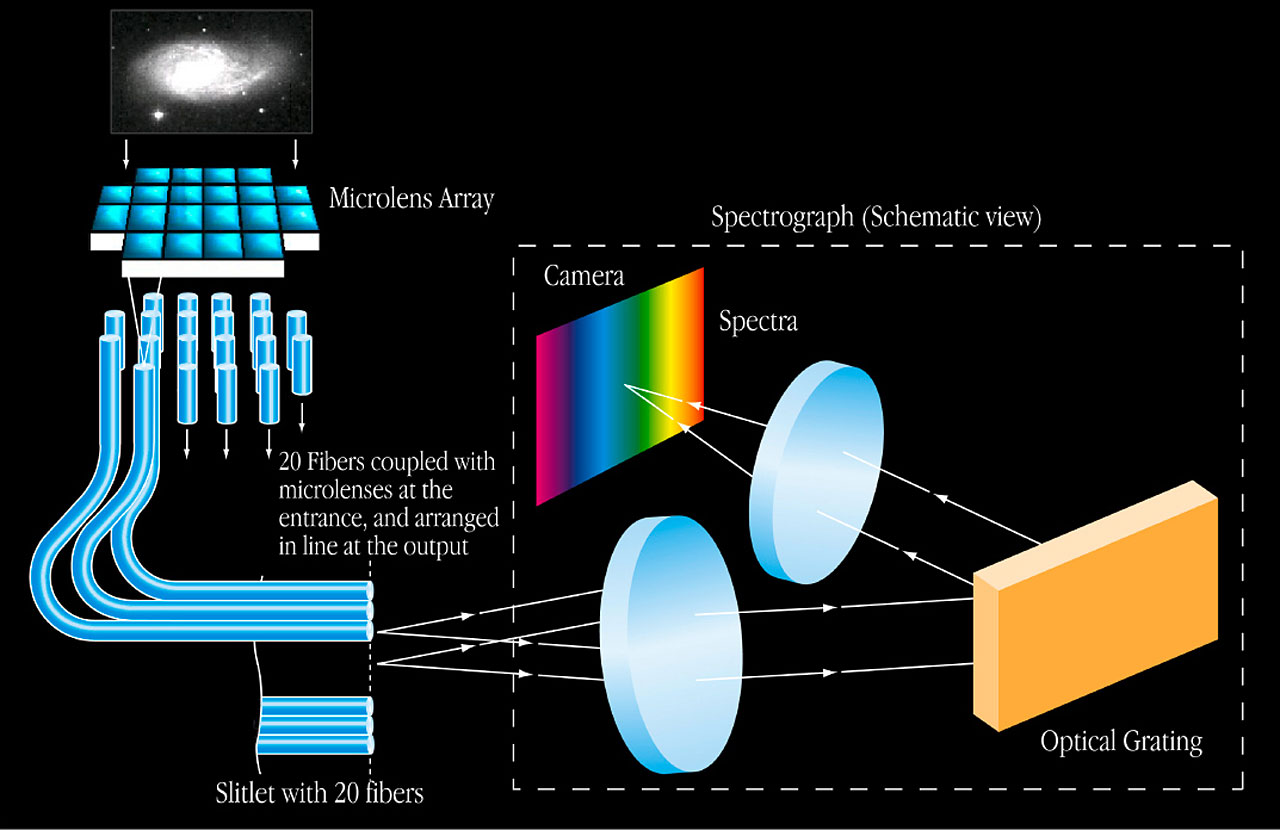
Integral field spectroscopy by coupling light into fibres using a lenslet array

An enlarged sky image feeds a mini-lens array, typically a few thousand identical lenses each about 1 mm in diameter. The lenslet array output is a regular grid of as many small telescope mirror images, which serves as the input for a multi-slit spectrograph that delivers the data cubes. This approach was advocated in the early 1980s, with the first ever IFS observations in 1987 with the lenslet-based optical TIGER (Note: French acronym: Traitement Intégral des Galaxies par l'Etude de leurs Raies) .

Pros are 100% on-sky spatial filling when using a square or hexagonal lenslet shape, high throughput, accurate photometry and an easy to build IFU. A significant con is the suboptimal use of precious detector pixels (~ 50% loss at least) in order to avoid contamination between adjacent spectra. In 2009 the BIGRE lenslet array was proposed to correctly approach the case of spatial and spectral samplings above the Nyquist rate over diffraction limited scenes, as required by high-contrast imaging spectroscopy. This optical concept widely improves the use of detector pixels thanks to the resulting spectrograph line spread function, minimizing inter-spectra crosstalk effects.

Instruments like the Spectrographic Areal Unit for Research on Optical Nebulae (SAURON) on the William Herschel Telescope and the Spectro-Polarimetric High-Contrast Exoplanet Research (SPHERE) IFS subsystem on European Southern Observatory (ESO)'s Very Large Telescope (VLT) use this technique, in the TIGER and BIGRE version respectively.

=== Fiber array ===
The sky image given by the telescope falls on a fiber-based image slicer. It is typically made of a few thousands fibers each about 0.1 mm diameter, with the square or circular input field reformatted into a narrow rectangular (long-slit-like) output. The image slicer output is then coupled to a classical long-slit spectrograph that delivers the datacubes. A sky demonstrator successfully undertook the first Fiber based IFS observation in 1990. It was followed by the full-fledged SILFID optical instrument some 5 years later. Coupling the circular fibers to a square or hexagonal lenslet array led to better light injection in the fiber and a nearly 100% filling factor of sky light.

Pros are 100% on-sky spatial filling, an efficient use of detector pixels and commercially available fiber-based image slicers. Cons are the sizable light loss in the fibers (~ 25%), their relatively poor photometric accuracy and their inability to work in a cryogenic environment. The latter limits wavelength coverage to less than 1.6 μm.

This technique is used by instruments in many telescopes (such as INTEGRAL at the William Herschel Telescope), and particularly in currently ongoing large surveys of galaxies, such as the Calar Alto Legacy Integral Field Area Survey (CALIFA) at the Calar Alto Observatory, the Sydney-AAO Multi-object Integral-field spectrograph (SAMI) at the Australian Astronomical Observatory, and the Mapping Nearby Galaxies at APO (MaNGA) which is one of the surveys making up the next phase of the Sloan Digital Sky Survey.

=== Mirror array ===
The sky image given by the telescope falls on a mirror-based "slicer," typically made of approximately 30 rectangular mirrors, 0.1 to 0.2 mm wide. The slicer reformats the input field into a collection of thin, adjacent "slices" resembling slits in a conventional multi-object spectrograph. This output is then fed to a classical long-slit spectrograph, which disperses and collects the incoming light. Such data can be reduced in the same fashion as a conventional multi-slit spectrograph, with post processing steps to recombine all spectra into a "cube" containing both spatial and spectral information. The first mirror-based slicer near-infrared IFS, the Spectrometer for Infrared Faint Field Imaging (SPIFFI) got its first science result in 2003. The key mirror slicer system was quickly substantially improved under the Advanced Imaging Slicer code name. A more recent slicer-based IFS is the Keck Cosmic Web Imager, KCWI, which features a choice of three separate slicers covering varying fields of view. This provides flexibility for observers to determine an optimal trade-off between field of view, spatial sampling, spectral resolution, and sensitivity to faint sources.

Pros are high throughput, 100% on-sky spatial filling, optimal use of detector pixels and the capability to work at cryogenic temperatures. On the other hand, it is difficult and expensive to manufacture and to align, especially when working in the optical domain given the more stringent optical surfaces specifications.

== Status ==
IFS are currently deployed in one flavor or another on many large ground-based telescopes, in the visible or near infrared domains, and on some space telescopes as well, in particular on the James Webb Space Telescope (JWST) in the near and middle infrared domains. As the spatial resolution of telescopes in space (and also of ground-based telescopes through adaptive optics based air turbulence corrections) has much improved in recent decades, the need for IFS facilities has become more and more pressing. Spectral resolution is usually a few thousands and wavelength coverage about one octave (i.e. a factor 2 in wavelength). Note that each IFS requires a finely tuned software package to transform the raw counts data in physical units (light intensity versus wavelength on precise sky locations)

== Panoramic IFS ==
Animation showing the galaxy NGC 7421 with MUSE data. The animation shows subsequent slices of the nitrogen line, emitted by star-forming regions. The animation begins with an image at a more blue wavelength and continues with a more red wavelength. Due to the rotation of the galaxy the emission lines are less redshifted on the left side.

With each spatial pixel dispersed on say 4096 spectral pixels on a state of the art 4096 x 4096 pixel detector, IFS fields of view are severely limited, ~10 arc second across when fed by an 8–10 m class telescope. That in turn mainly limits IFS-based astrophysical science to single small targets. A much larger field of view, 1 arc minute across, or a sky area 36 times larger, is needed to cover hundreds of highly distant galaxies, in a single, if very long (up to 100 hours), exposure. This in turn requires to develop IFS systems featuring at least about half a billion detector pixels.

The brute force approach would have been to build huge spectrographs feeding gigantic detector arrays. Instead, the two Panoramic IFS in operation by 2022, Multi-unit spectroscopic explorer (MUSE) and Visible Integral-field Replicable Unit Spectrograph (VIRUS), are made of respectively 24 and 120 serial-produced optical IFS. This results in substantially smaller and cheaper instruments. The mirror slicer based MUSE instrument started operation at the VLT in 2014 and the fiber sliced based VIRUS on the Hobby–Eberly Telescope in 2021.

== Multi-Object IFS ==
It is conceptually straightforward to combine the capabilities of Integral Field Spectroscopy and Multi-Object Spectroscopy in a single instrument. This can be done by deploying a number of small IFUs in a large sky patrol field, possibly a degree or more across. In that way, quite detailed information on, for example, a number of selected galaxies can be obtained in one go. There is of course a tradeoff between the spatial coverage on each target and the total number accessible of targets. The Fibre Large Array Multi Element Spectrograph (FLAMES), the first instrument featuring this capability, had first light in this mode at the VLT in 2002. A number of such facilities are now in operation targeting visible and near infrared wavelengths.

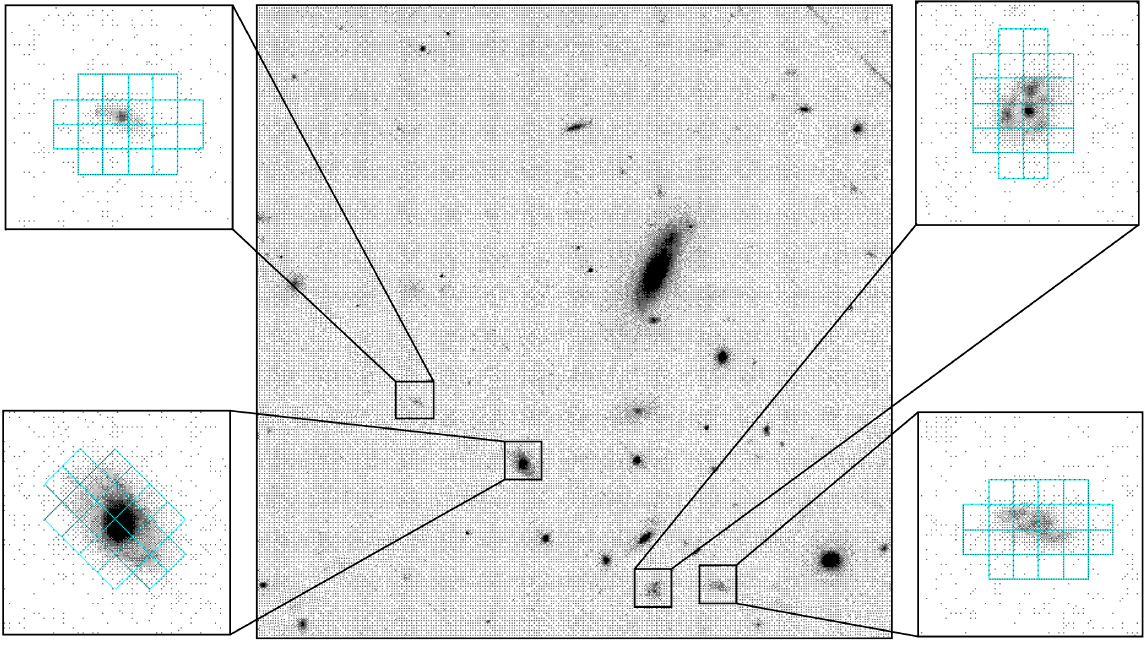
An example of observations with Integral Field Units at FLAMES/ESO

One such approach was used by the SDSS MaNGA program, Mapping Nearby Galaxies at Apache Point Observatory. MaNGA used IFUs composed of hexagonal fiber bundles to survey about ~10,000 nearby galaxies around redshift 0.03, studying their dynamical state, composition, and formation history. MaNGA was able to use 17 IFU fiber bundles per spectroscopic plate, efficiently targeting many objects simultaneously.

A clever alternative approach to obtaining spatially resolved spectroscopy of many objects simultaneously is the MSA-3D program which uses the micro-shutter array of the JWST NIRSpec instrument to target many objects simultaneously. While not strictly an integral-field unit, the MSA-3D program takes many exposures while "stepping" the conventional slitmask provided by the MSA across the sky. These exposures can be combined after the fact to provide full, 3D spatial and spectral information on each object. While the MSA-3D approach provides much lower spatial resolution than the IFU provided with NIRSpec, and requires many more exposures, it has the advantage of being able to target dozens of nearby objects simultaneously.

Even larger latitude in the choice of coverage of the patrol field has been proposed under the name of Diverse Field Spectroscopy (DFS) which would allow the observer to select arbitrary combinations of sky regions to maximize observing efficiency and scientific return. This requires technological developments, in particular versatile robotic target pickups and photonic switchyards.

== Three-dimensional detectors ==
Other techniques can achieve the same ends at different wavelengths. In particular, at radio wavelengths, simultaneous spectral information is obtained with heterodyne receivers, featuring large frequency coverage and huge spectral resolution.

In the X-ray domain, owing to the high energy of individual photons, aptly called 3D photon counting detectors not only measure on the fly the 2D position of incoming photons but also their energy, hence their wavelength. Note nevertheless that spectral information is very coarse, with spectral resolutions ~10 only. One example is the Advanced CCD Imaging Spectrometer (ACIS) on NASA’s Chandra X-ray Observatory.

In the Visible-Near Infrared, this approach is a lot harder with the much less energetic photons. Nevertheless small format superconducting detectors, with limited spectral resolution ~ 30 and cooled below 0.1 K, have been developed and successfully used, such as for example the 32x32 pixels Array Camera for Optical to Near-infrared Spectrophotometry (ARCONS) Camera at the Hale 200” Telescope. In contrast, ‘classical’ IFS usually feature spectral resolutions of a few thousands.
