= Fibre multi-object spectrograph =

Fibre optic spectrograph that is part of the Subaru Telescope in Hawaii

FMOS – Fibre multi-object spectrograph

Fibre multi-object spectrograph (FMOS) is facility instrument for the Subaru Telescope on Mauna Kea in Hawaii. The instrument consists of a complex fibre-optic positioning system mounted at the prime focus of the telescope. Fibres are then fed to a pair of large spectrographs, each weighing nearly 3000 kg. The instrument will be used to look at the light from up to 400 stars or galaxies simultaneously over a field of view of 30 arcminutes (about the size of the full moon on the sky). The instrument will be used for a number of key programmes, including galaxy formation and evolution and dark energy via a measurement of the rate at which the universe is expanding.

== Design, construction, operation ==
It is currently being built by a consortium of institutes led by Kyoto University and Oxford University with parts also being manufactured by the Rutherford Appleton Laboratory, Durham University and the Anglo-Australian Observatory. The instrument is scheduled for engineering first-light in late 2008.

== OH-suppression ==
The spectrographs use a technique called OH-suppression to increase the sensitivity of the observations: The incoming light from the fibres is dispersed to a relatively high resolution and this spectrum forms an image on a pair of spherical mirrors which have been etched at the positions corresponding to the bright OH-lines. This spectrum is then re-imaged through a second diffraction grating to allow the full spectrum (without the OH lines) to be imaged onto a single infrared detector.
