= ALSM =

ALSM may refer to:

- ALSM1 protein, involved in Alström syndrome
- Airborne laser swath mapping, an application of Lidar
- AlphaSmart (NASDAQ trading symbol "ALSM")
- Average learning Subspace method, a form of Land cover mapping
- Annie Lorrain Smith (1854–1937), British lichenologist (taxonomic author abbreviation "A.L.Sm.")
