= NDRE =

NDRE or Ndre may refer to:

- National Defence Radio Establishment, Swedish signals intelligence agency
- Normalized difference red edge index, a metric for vegetation
- Norwegian Defence Research Establishment, military research and development agency

== People with the given name Ndre ==
- Ndre Mjeda (1866–1937), Albanian poet and activist
- Andrea Bogdani (c. 1600-1683), also known as Ndre Bogdani, Albanian scholar and prelate of the Roman Catholic Church

== See also ==
- Ndrek Luca (1927–1995), an Albanian actor
