= World Resources Institute =

Non-profit organization

World Resources Institute (WRI)
- Formation: 1982; 44 years ago
- Founder: James Gustave Speth
- Headquarters: Washington, D.C. United States
- President and CEO: Ani Dasgupta
- Chairman of the Board: David Blood
- Revenue: US$ 212 million (2025)
- Expenses: US$ 305 million (2025)
- Endowment: US$ 38 million (2025)
- Staff: 948 (2024)
- Volunteers: 26 (2024)
- Website: WRI.org

The World Resources Institute (frequently just WRI) is a global non-profit research organization established in 1982 with funding from the MacArthur Foundation under the leadership of James Gustave Speth. Subsequent presidents include Jonathan Lash (1993–2011), Andrew D. Steer (2012–2021) and current president Ani Dasgupta (2021–present).

WRI studies sustainable practices for business, economics, finance and governance, with the purpose of better supporting human society in six areas: food, forests, water, energy, cities, and climate. The institute's flagship report series is the World Resources Report, each of which deals with a different topic. WRI encourages initiatives for monitoring, data analysis, and risk assessment, including global and open source projects. WRI has maintained a 4 out of 4 stars rating from Charity Navigator since 1 October 2008.

== Organization ==
The mission of the World Resources Institute (WRI) is to “move society to provide for the needs and aspirations of current and future generations”. It seeks to promote a sustainable human society with a basis of human health and well-being, environmental sustainability, and economic opportunity. WRI partners with local and national governments, private companies, publicly held corporations, and other non-profits, and offers services including global climate change issues, sustainable markets, ecosystem protection, and environmentally responsible governance services.

The World Resources Institute maintains international offices in Brazil, China, Colombia, Ethiopia, India, Indonesia, Kenya, Mexico, the Netherlands, Turkey, the United Kingdom and the United States and is active in over 50 countries. A report by the Center for International Policy's Foreign Influence Transparency Initiative of the top 50 think tanks on the University of Pennsylvania's Global Go-To Think Tanks rating index found that during the period 2014–2018 World Resources Institute received more funding from outside the United States than any other think tank, with a total of more than US$63 million, though this was described as "unsurprising" given the institute's presence in so many countries. In 2014, Stephen M. Ross, an American real estate developer, gave the organization US$30 million to establish the WRI Ross Center for Sustainable Cities. One of the largest donors to WRI's Land and Carbon Lab is the Bezos Earth Fund, which financed the lab with over $100 million in 2021. In 2025, Michael and Tanya Polsky through the Polsky Foundation gave WRI and the University of Chicago a $100 million contribution, of which $75 million was slated to establish the WRI Polsky Center for the Global Energy Transition. WRI's revenue stood at $212 million in 2025.

== Initiatives ==
WRI's activities are focused on the areas of water (including oceans), forests, climate, energy, food and cities. WRI is active in initiatives for monitoring, data analysis, and risk assessment. WRI emphasizes the extent to which systems are linked, and the need to connect issues such as addressing food insecurity with strategies to address climate change, protect ecosystems, and provide economic security.

Food, Land and Water

In 1997 and 2000, WRI published the first comparative study of material flow accounting (MFA), using time series data to comprehensively assess all material inputs and outputs (excluding water) used by industrial economies.

Beginning in 2002, the World Resources Institute worked with the Cameroon Forest Initiative, to combine disparate sources of data on land use to form digital and paper maps to track changes to Cameroon's forests and improve their management. They integrated satellite imagery with information on agricultural terrain, boundaries, protected land, community-owned forests, and authorized land use by commercial logging operations and mining concessions.

In 2014, WRI built upon Matthew C. Hansen's work at the University of Maryland on forest change analysis. WRI partnered with Google Earth Engine to develop Global Forest Watch (GFW), an open-source web application that uses Landsat satellite imagery to map forest changes. Weekly GLAD deforestation alerts and daily Fires alerts can be specific to a 30 square metres (320 sq ft) area. Global Forest Watch is most frequently used by nongovernmental organizations (NGOs), academic researchers, government employees, and the private sector. It is also used by journalists and indigenous groups, many of whose lands are threatened. Applications of Global Forest Watch include rapid detection and response to fires, detecting illegal logging, assuring supply chain transparency, and assessing endangered tiger habitats.

As of January 2021, WRI used Global Forest Watch to generate a forest carbon flux map that combined data about emissions and removals of forest-related greenhouse gases. Using a new method for integrating ground, airborne, and satellite data to measure carbon fluctuations in forests, they were able to map forests worldwide at a resolution of 30 metres (98 ft) yearly from 2001–2019. They were able to identify the contributions of different forest types, confirming that tropical forests both absorb more carbon than other types of forests, and release more as a result of deforestation and degradation. By integrating emissions and removals, the map increases the transparency and accuracy of global carbon estimates and can support more effective forest management decisions.

In addition to mapping carbon emissions from forest loss, WRI is working with scientists at Purdue University, Science-i, and the Global Forest Biodiversity Initiative to develop methods for assessing carbon accumulation rates in forested ecosystems. Such rates are affected by three forest growth components, which are difficult to measure: ingrowth, upgrowth and mortality. Being able to assess this more accurately would reduce uncertainty in estimating the impact of global forests as a carbon sink.

WRI has partnered with Google Earth Engine to develop Dynamic World, a near real-time (NRT) application that uses high-resolution satellite images to do land use land cover (LULC) classification. Dynamic World identifies areas of land and water such as wetlands, forests, trees, crops and urban areas. Released in June 2022, its uses include monitoring ecosystem restoration, assessing protected areas, and detecting land changes due to deforestation and fires.

Working with the Sustainability Consortium, WRI works to identify and quantify major drivers of forest losses. For example, they have identified industrial scale internationally traded commodity crops such as beef, soybeans, palm oil, corn, and cotton as a dominant driver of forest loss in South America and Southeast Asia.

Cities

In 2014, philanthropist Stephen M. Ross established the WRI Ross Center for Sustainable Cities through a major gift. The Center focuses on the development of sustainable cities and improvements in quality of life in developing countries around the world. WRI's flagship report for 2021 was Seven Transformations for More Equitable and Sustainable Cities. It followed Accelerating Building Efficiency: Eight Actions for Urban Leaders (2019).

Energy

The Platform for Accelerating the Circular Economy (PACE) is a public-private collaboration platform and project accelerating focusing on building the circular economy. PACE was launched during the 2018 World Economic Forum Annual meeting.

The Renewable Energy Buyers Alliance (REBA) is an alliance of large clean energy buyers, energy providers, and service providers that is unlocking the marketplace for all non-residential energy buyers to lead a rapid transition to a cleaner, prosperous, zero-carbon renewable energy future. It has over 200 members including Google, GM, Facebook, Walmart, Disney and other large companies, and reached 6 GW capacity in 2018.

Oceans

In 2008, the World Resources Institute reported on water quality world-wide, identifying over 400 dead zones due to eutrophication including areas in the Baltic Sea, the Chesapeake Bay in the United States, and Australia's Great Barrier Reef (33, 34). Eutrophication results from the discharge of highly concentrated phosphorus in urban wastewater into lakes and rivers, and from agricultural nutrient pollution. WRI advocates for the use of local nature-based solutions (NBS), which tend to be cost-effective, to improve ecosystems, resist water-related climate impacts, and mitigate the effects of warming. WRI publishes the Aqueduct Water Risk Atlas, ranking countries in terms of risk of severe water crises.

WRI is active in studying the world's coral reefs, publishing reports in 1998 and 2011 that tracked damages due to coastal development, overfishing, climate change and rising ocean acidity. A 2022 report examines reefs to a 500 metres (1,600 ft) resolution and analyzes the protection that reefs provide to people, infrastructure and the GDP.

Climate

WRI worked with companies to develop a common standard, the Greenhouse Gas Protocol for quantifying and managing GHG emissions. WRI tracks estimates of fossil fuel combustion and greenhouse gas emissions, published as biennial reports. WRI's Science Based Targets initiative (SBTi) was established in 2015 to help companies to set emission reduction targets in line with climate science. The WRI manages the Climate Watch website (formerly known as the CAIT Climate Data Explorer), which enables journalists and others to examine greenhouse gas data by country and per capita emissions.

Others

WRI's LandMark project provides maps and information indicating lands that are collectively held and used by Indigenous peoples and local communities. Data for the Amazon region has shown that rainforest managed by local and Indigenous communities stores carbon dioxide, while rainforest managed by government and private interests is a net source of greenhouse gases.

Other WRI initiatives include The Access Initiative, which ranks countries based on environmental democracy, the ability of citizens to engage in decision-making about natural resources, as measured by transparency, public participation laws, and access to justice.

WRI's Champions 12.3 coalition promotes a “Target, Measure, Act” strategy with the goal of halving food loss and waste by 2030.

== Criticism ==
A 1990 study by the World Resources Institute was criticized by Anil Agarwal, who had been on the council of the World Resources Institute from 1988 to 1990. Agarwal, who "was among the first to argue that concepts of social equity need to be integrated into international policies aimed at mitigating the harmful effects of human-induced climate change", accused WRI of allocating too much responsibility for global warming to developing countries, and under-acknowledging the impact of U.S. overconsumption on global warming. He called the WRI study an example of environmental colonialism and suggested that a fairer analysis would balance sources of emissions against terrestrial sinks for each nation. His critique sparked considerable debate about the appropriate methodologies for such analysis, and resulted in increased awareness of the issues involved.

== See also ==
- Open energy system databases § Power Explorer
- Rafe Pomerance
- Center for International Policy
- MacArthur Foundation
