= Tasseled cap transformation =

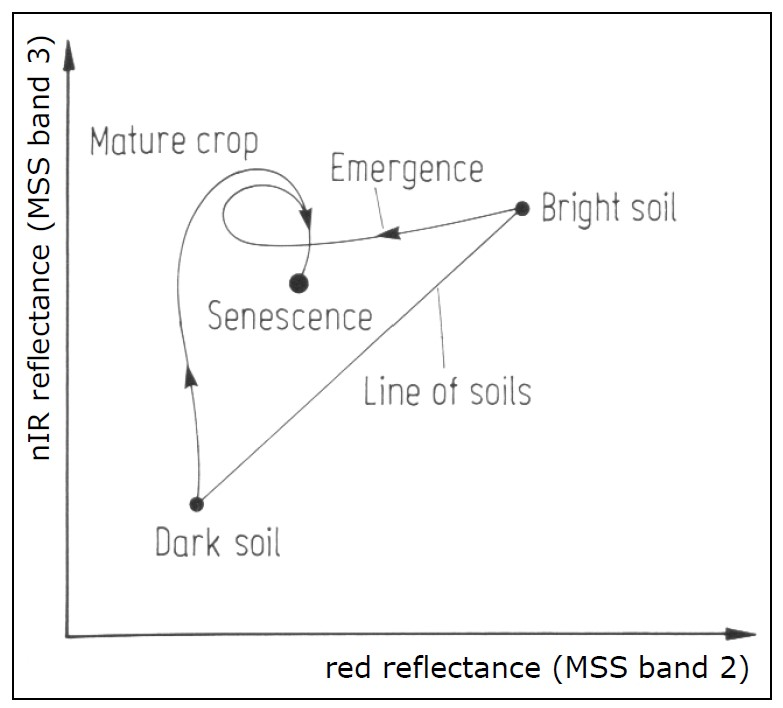
Tasseled Cap Transformation for bright and dark soil

Tasseled cap transformation is a method to transform the spectral information of satellite data into spectral indicators. This index is used especially in the analysis of vegetation (phenological stages).

== Background ==
In 1976, the Tasseled Cap Index was published by R.J. Kauth and G.S. Thomas. It was generated on the basis of spectral information from the Landsat satellite. The Tasseled Cap coefficients used in the linear equation of the Tasseled Cap transformation are sensor specific and therefore, were derived for each sensor system. The index is related to principal component analysis and vegetation indices.

== Calculation ==
Six of seven Landsat TM bands are used for the algorithm, generating three levels of information:

- Tasseled Cap Band 1 (brightness, a measurement value for the ground)
- Tasseled Cap Band 2 (greenness, a measured value for the vegetation)
- Tasseled Cap Band 3 (wetness, a measured value for interactions of soil and canopy moisture)

The algorithm for these three levels of information is a weighted sum of the Landsat bands (without the thermal channel 6), where each band is multiplied by the specific coefficients. Early Landsat products:

- Brightness = 0.3037 (band 1) + 0.2793 (band 2) + 0.4743 (band 3) + 0.5585 (band 4) + 0.5082 (band 5) + 0.1863 (band 7)
- Greenness = −0.2848 (band 1) − 0.2435 (band 2) − 0.5436 (band 3) + 0.7243 (band 4) + 0.0840 (band 5) − 0.1800 (band 7)
- Wetness = 0.1509 (band 1) + 0.1973 (band 2) + 0.3279 (band 3) + 0.3406 (band 4) − 0.7112 (band 5) − 0.4572 (band 7)

Landsat 8/9 products:

- Brightness = 0.3037 (band 2) + 0.2793 (band 3) + 0.4743 (band 4) + 0.5585 (band 5) + 0.5082 (band 6) + 0.1863 (band 7)
- Greenness = −0.2941 (band 2) − 0.243 (band 3) − 0.5424 (band 4) + 0.7276 (band 5) + 0.0713 (band 6) − 0.1608 (band 7)
- Wetness = 0.1511 (band 2) + 0.1973 (band 3) + 0.3283 (band 4) + 0.3407 (band 5) − 0.7117 (band 6) − 0.4559 (band 7)
