= Red edge =

Region of change in vegetation reflectance

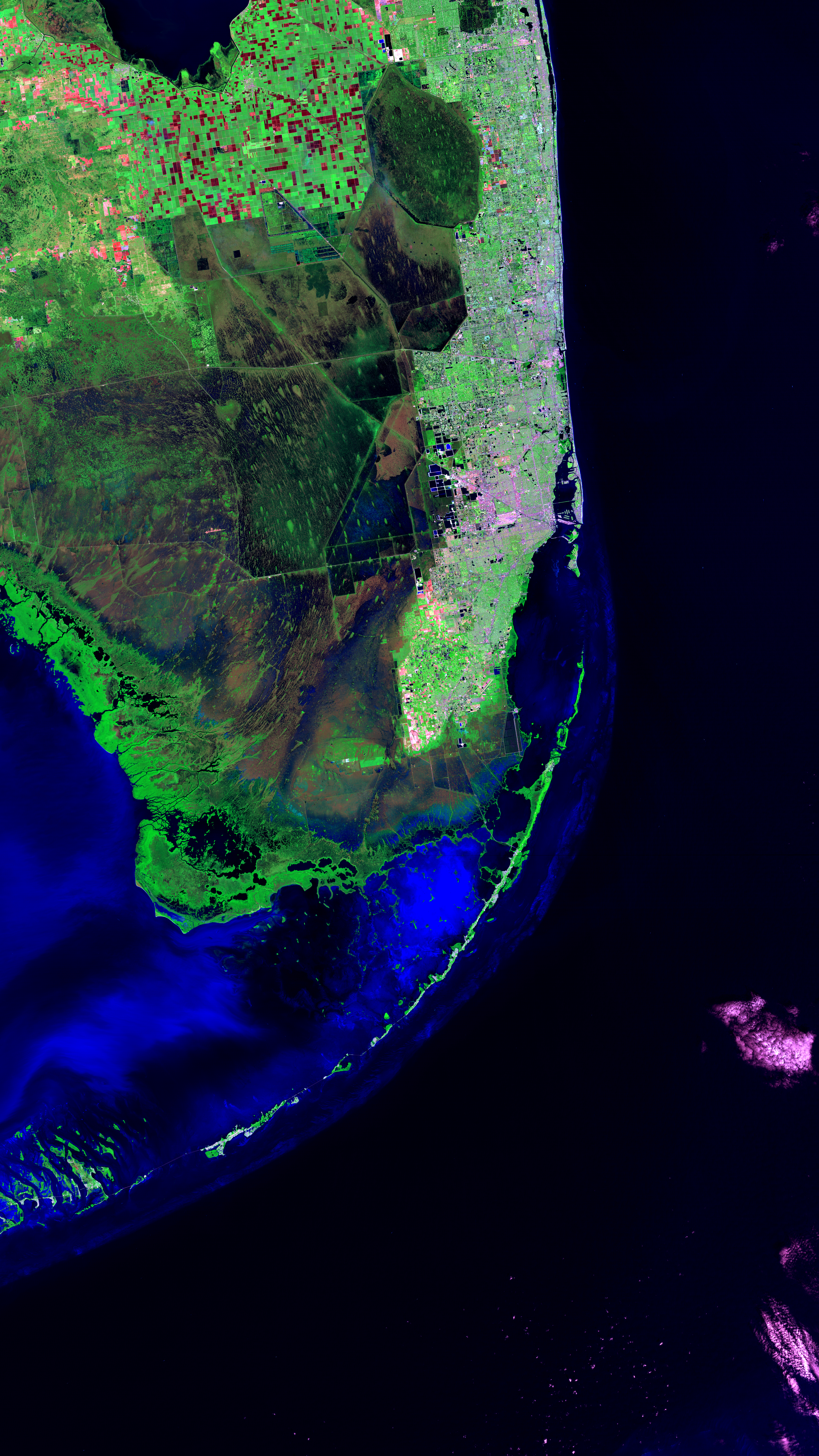
A false-color image of South Florida as generated by data from Landsat 5. Green represents the reflected near infrared light indicative of healthy vegetation.

Red edge refers to the region of rapid change in reflectance of vegetation in the near infrared range of the electromagnetic spectrum. Chlorophyll contained in vegetation absorbs most of the light in the visible part of the spectrum but becomes almost transparent at wavelengths greater than 700 nm. The cellular structure of the vegetation then causes this infrared light to be reflected because each cell acts something like an elementary corner reflector. The change can be from 5% to 50% reflectance going from 680 nm to 730 nm. This is an advantage to plants in avoiding overheating during photosynthesis. For a more detailed explanation and a graph of the photosynthetically active radiation (PAR) spectral region, see Normalized difference vegetation index § Rationale.

The phenomenon accounts for the brightness of foliage in infrared photography and is extensively utilized in the form of so-called vegetation indices (e.g. Normalized difference vegetation index). It is used in remote sensing to monitor plant activity, and it has been suggested that it could be useful to detect light-harvesting organisms on distant planets.

== See also ==
- Enhanced vegetation index – Index for improving vegetation monitoring
- Purple Earth hypothesis – Astrobiological hypothesis regarding early photosynthetic organisms
- Vegetation Index
