= Normalized difference water index =

Remote sensing-derived indexes related to liquid water

Normalized difference water index (NDWI) may refer to one of at least two remote sensing-derived indexes related to liquid water:

One is used to monitor changes in water content of leaves, using near-infrared (NIR) and short-wave infrared (SWIR) wavelengths, proposed by Gao in 1996:

$$\mbox{NDWI}=\frac{(Xnir - Xswir)}{(Xnir + Xswir)}$$

Another is used to monitor changes related to water content in water bodies, using green and NIR wavelengths, defined by McFeeters (1996):

$$\mbox{NDWI}=\frac{(Xgreen - Xnir)}{(Xgreen + Xnir)}$$

== Overview ==
In remote sensing, ratio image or spectral ratioing are enhancement techniques in which a raster pixel from one spectral band is divided by the corresponding value in another band. Both the indexes above share this same functional form; the choice of bands used is what makes them appropriate for a specific purpose.

If looking to monitor vegetation in drought affected areas, then it is advisable to use NDWI index proposed by Gao utilizing NIR and SWIR. The SWIR reflectance in this index reflects changes in both the vegetation water content and the spongy mesophyll structure in vegetation canopies. The NIR reflectance is affected by leaf internal structure and leaf dry matter content, but not by water content. The combination of the NIR with the SWIR removes variations induced by leaf internal structure and leaf dry matter content, improving the accuracy in retrieving the vegetation water content.

NDWI concept as formulated by Gao combining reflectance of NIR and SWIR is more common and has wider range of application. It can be used for exploring water content at single leaf level as well as canopy/satellite level.

The range of application of NDWI (Gao, 1996) spreads from agricultural monitoring for crop irrigation and pasture management to forest monitoring for assessing fire risk and live fuel moisture particularly relevant in the context of climate change.

Different SWIR bands can be used to characterize the water absorption in generalized form of NDWI as shown in eq. 1. Two major water absorption features in SWIR spectral region are centered near 1450 nm and 1950 nm while two minor absorption features are centered near 970 and 1200 nm in a living vegetation spectrum. Sentinel-2 MSI has two spectral bands in SWIR region: band 11 (central wavelength 1610 nm) and band 12 (central wavelength 2200 nm). Spectral band in NIR region with similar 20 m ground resolution is band 8A (central wavelength 865 nm).

Sentinel-2 NDWI for agricultural monitoring of drought and irrigation management can be constructed using either combinations:

- band 8A (864 nm) and band 11 (1610 nm)
- band 8A (864 nm) and band 12 (2200 nm)

Both formulations are suitable.

Sentinel-2 NDWI for waterbody detection can be constructed by using:

- "Green" Band 3 (559 nm) and "NIR" Band 8A (864 nm)

McFeeters index: If looking for water bodies or change in water level (e.g. flooding), then it is advisable to use the green and NIR spectral bands or green and SWIR spectral bands. Modification of normalised difference water index (MNDWI) has been suggested for improved detection of open water by replacing NIR spectral band with SWIR.

== Interpretation ==
Visual or digital interpretation of the output image/raster created is similar to NDVI:

- -1 to 0 - bright surface with no vegetation or water content
- +1 - represent water content

For the second variant of the NDWI, another threshold can also be found in that avoids creating false alarms in urban areas:

- < 0.3 - non-water
- >= 0.3 - water.

== See also ==
- Normalized difference red edge index
- Normalized difference vegetation index
- Electromagnetic absorption by water
