= Normalized difference red edge index =

Metric in biology

The normalized difference red edge index (NDRE) is a metric that can be used to analyse whether images obtained from multi-spectral image sensors contain healthy vegetation or not. It does this by measuring the amount of chlorophyll in a plant.

It is similar to Normalized Difference Vegetation Index (NDVI) but uses the ratio of Near-Infrared and the edge of Red as follows:

$$\mbox{NDRE}=\frac{(\mbox{NIR}-\mbox{RE})}{(\mbox{NIR}+\mbox{RE})}$$

The red edge is the part of the spectrum centered around 715 nm.

The Index will give a value between -1.0 to +1.0, with a higher value showing a healthy plant environment.

== See also ==
- Normalized difference water index
