= Vegetation index =

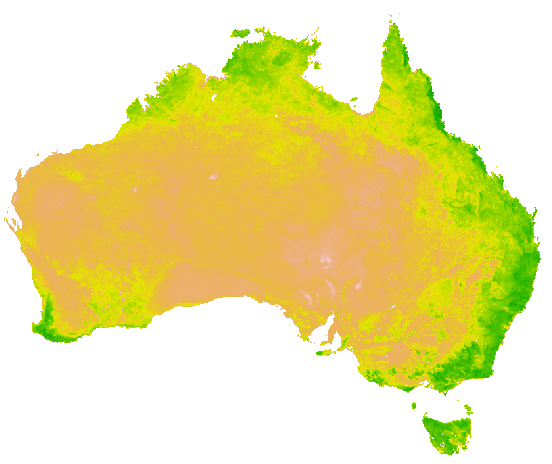
6- monthly NDVI average for Australia, 1 Dec 2012 to 31 May 2013

A vegetation index (VI) is a spectral imaging transformation of two or more image bands designed to enhance the contribution of vegetation properties and allow reliable spatial and temporal inter-comparisons of terrestrial photosynthetic activity and canopy structural variations.

There are many VIs, with many being functionally equivalent. Many of the indices make use of the inverse relationship between red and near-infrared reflectance associated with healthy green vegetation. Since the 1960s scientists have used satellite remote sensing to monitor fluctuation in vegetation at the Earth's surface. Measurements of vegetation attributes include leaf area index (LAI), percent green cover, chlorophyll content, green biomass and absorbed photosynthetically active radiation (APAR).

VIs have been historically classified based on a range of attributes, including the number of spectral bands (2 or greater than 2); the method of calculations (ratio or orthogonal), depending on the required objective; or by their historical development (classified as first generation VIs or second generation VIs). For the sake of comparison of the effectiveness of different VIs, Lyon, Yuan et al. (1998) classified 7 VIs based on their computation methods (Subtraction, Division or Rational Transform). Due to advances in hyperspectral remote sensing technology, high-resolution reflectance spectrums are now available, which can be used with traditional multispectral VIs. In addition, VIs have been developed to be used specifically with hyperspectral data, such as the use of Narrow Band Vegetation Indices.

== Uses ==
Vegetation indices have been used to:

- examine climate trends;
- estimate water content of soils remotely;
- monitor drought;
- schedule crop irrigation, crop management;
- monitor evaporation and plant transpiration.
- assess changes in biodiversity
- classify vegetation
- detection and quantification of crop diseases

== Types of vegetation index ==
=== Multispectral Vegetation Index ===
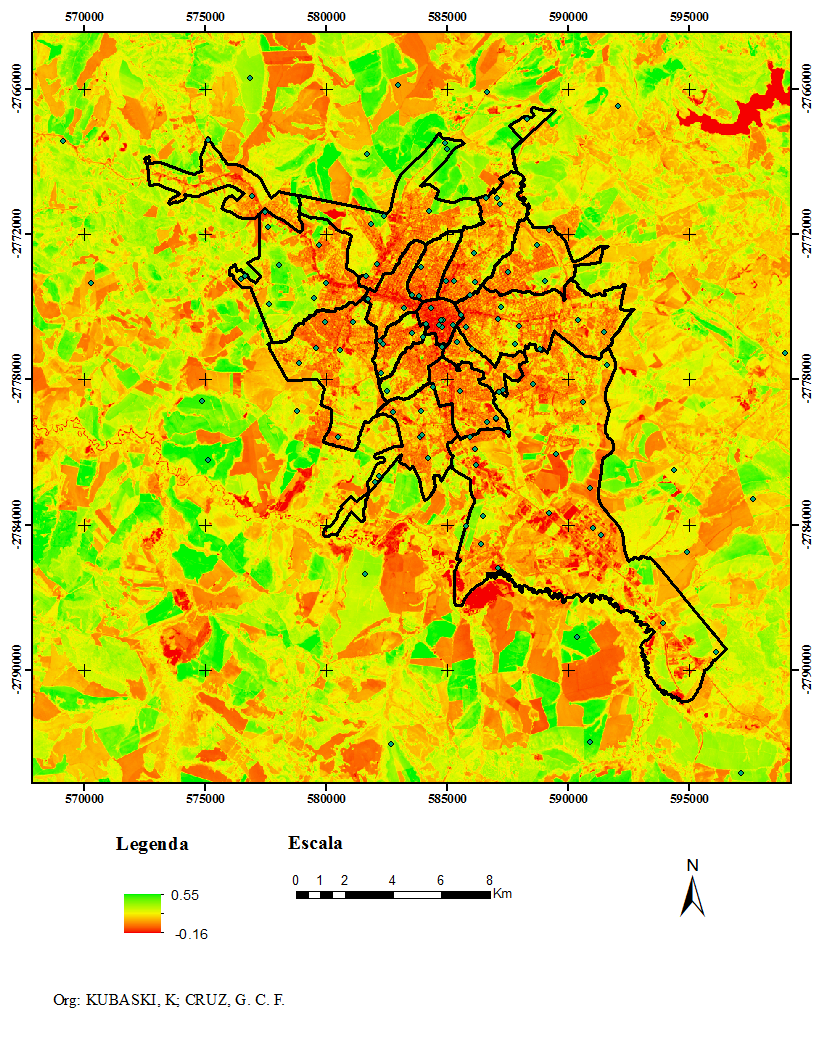
NDVI through Landsat 8 applied to the urban area of Ponta Grossa, southern Brazil

- Ratio Vegetation Index (RVI): Defined as the ratio between the Red and Near Infrared lights of multispectral images
- Normalised Difference Vegetation Index (NDVI): The most commonly used remote sensing index that calculates the ratio of the difference and sum between the Near Infrared and Red bands of multispectral images. It normally takes values between -1 and +1. It is mostly used in vegetation dynamics monitoring, including biomass quantification.
- Kauth-Thomas Tasseled Cap Transformation: A spectral enhancement index that transforms the spectral information of a satellite data into spectral features
- Infrared Index
- Normalized difference water index
- Perpendicular Vegetation Index
- Greenness Above Bare Soil
- Moisture Stress Index: A spectral index that measures the level of moisture stress in leaves
- Leaf Water Content Index (LWCI)
- MidIR Index
- Soil-Adjusted Vegetation Index (SAVI): An adjusted form of NDVI developed to minimize the effects of soil brightness on spectral vegetation indices, particularly in areas of high soil composition
- Modified SAVI: Mostly applied in to areas with low NDVI measures.
- Atmospherically Resistant Vegetation Index
- Soil and Atmospherically Resistant Vegetation Index
- Enhanced Vegetation Index (EVI): Very similar to NDVI. The only difference is that it corrects atmospheric and canopy background noise, particularly in regions with high biomass
- New Vegetation Index
- Aerosol Free Vegetation Index
- Triangular Vegetation Index
- Reduced Simple Ratio
- Visible Atmospherically Resistant Index
- Normalised Difference Built-Up Index
- Weighted Difference Vegetation Index (WDVI)
- Fraction of absorbed photosynthetically active radiation (FAPAR)
- Normalised Difference Greenness index (NDGI)
- Temperature Vegetation Water Stress Index (TVWSI)

=== Hyperspectral Vegetation Index ===
With the advent of hyperspectral data, vegetation index have been developed specifically for hyperspectral data.

- Discrete-Band Normalised Difference Vegetation Index
- Yellowness Index
- Photochemical Reflectance Index
- Descrete-Band Normalised Difference Water Index
- Red Edge Position Determination
- Crop Chlorophyll Content Prediction
- Moment distance index (MDI)

=== Advanced Vegetation Indices ===
With the emergence of machine learning, certain algorithms can be used to determine vegetation indices from data. This allows to take into account all spectral bands and to discover hidden parameters that can be useful to strengthen these vegetation indices. Thus, they can be more robust against light variations, shadows or even uncalibrated images if these artifacts exist in the training data.

- Synthesis of Vegetation Indices Using Genetic Programming
- A soft computing approach for selecting and combining spectral bands
- DeepIndices: Remote Sensing Indices Based on Approximation of Functions through Deep Learning

== See also ==
- Crop coefficient
