= Soil-adjusted vegetation index =

Vegetation index

Empirically derived NDVI products have been shown to be unstable, varying with soil colour, soil moisture, and saturation effects from high density vegetation. In an attempt to improve NDVI, Huete developed a vegetation index that accounted for the differential red and near-infrared extinction through the vegetation canopy. The index is a transformation technique that minimizes soil brightness influences from spectral vegetation indices involving red and near-infrared (NIR) wavelengths.

The index is given as:

$$\mbox{SAVI}=\frac{(\mbox{1}+\mbox{L})(\mbox{NIR}-\mbox{Red})}{(\mbox{NIR}+\mbox{Red}+\mbox{L})}$$

where L is a canopy background adjustment factor. An L value of 0.5 in reflectance space was found to minimize soil brightness variations and eliminate the need for additional calibration for different soils. The transformation was found to nearly eliminate soil-induced variations in vegetation indices.
