= Enhanced vegetation index =

Index for improving vegetation monitoring

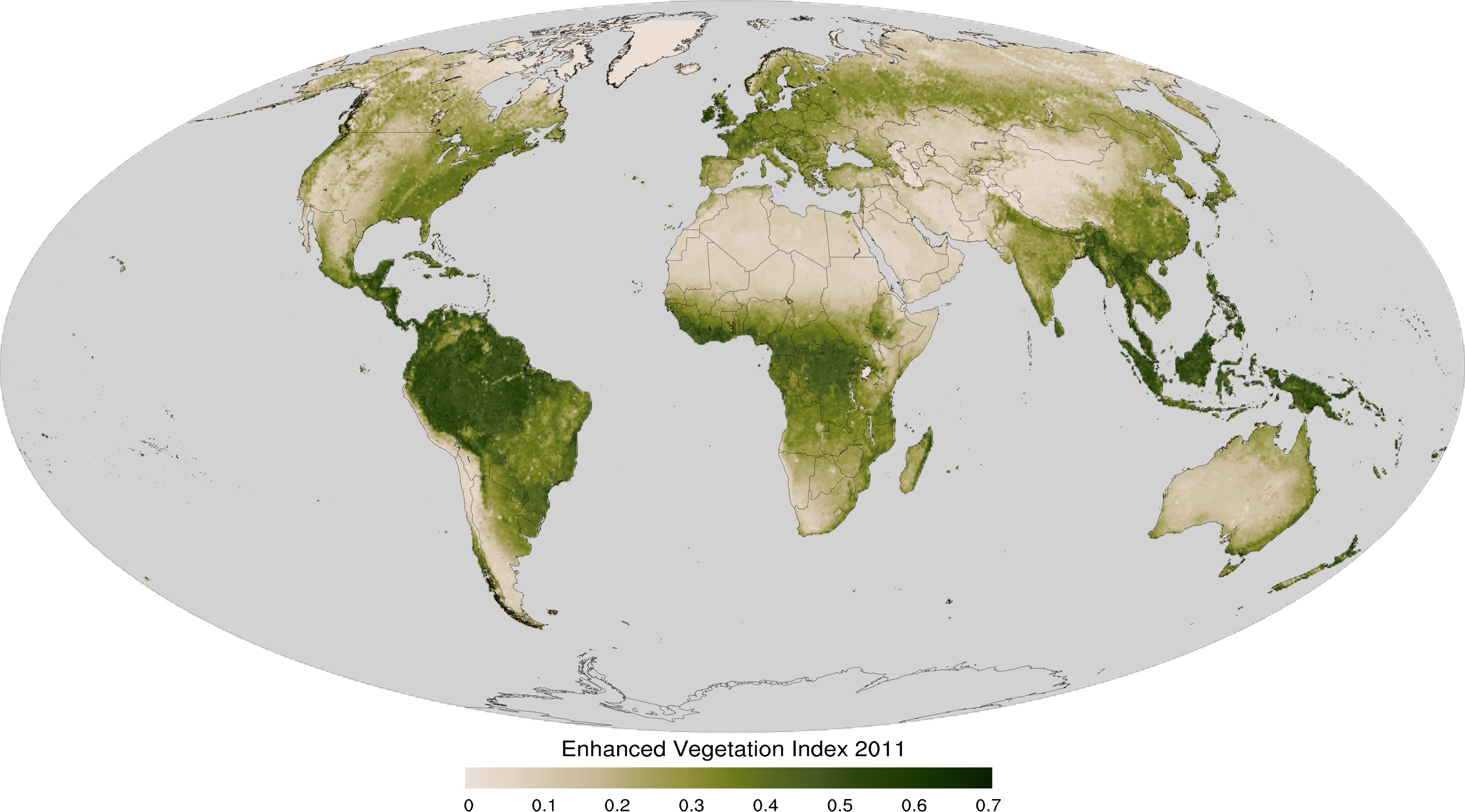
2011 Enhanced vegetation index based on MODIS Terra data

The enhanced vegetation index (EVI) is an 'optimized' vegetation index designed to enhance the vegetation signal with improved sensitivity in high biomass regions and improved vegetation monitoring through a de-coupling of the canopy background signal and a reduction in atmosphere influences. EVI is computed following this equation:

$$\text{EVI} = G \times \frac{(\text{NIR} - \text{Red})}{(\text{NIR} + C_1 \times \text{Red} - C_2 \times \text{Blue} + L)}$$

where:

- NIR, Red, and Blue are atmospherically-corrected and partially atmosphere-corrected (Rayleigh and ozone absorption) surface reflectances
- L is the canopy background adjustment that addresses non-linear, differential NIR and red radiant transfer through a canopy, and
- C_{1}, C_{2} are the coefficients of the aerosol resistance term, which uses the blue band to correct for aerosol influences in the red band.
- G is a gain factor.

The coefficients adopted in the MODIS-EVI algorithm are: L=1, C_{1} = 6, C_{2} = 7.5, and G = 2.5.

Whereas the Normalized Difference Vegetation Index (NDVI) is chlorophyll sensitive, the EVI is more responsive to canopy structural variations, including leaf area index (LAI), canopy type, plant physiognomy, and canopy architecture. The two vegetation indices complement each other in global vegetation studies and improve upon the detection of vegetation changes and extraction of canopy biophysical parameters.

Another difference between Normalized Difference Vegetation Index (NDVI) and EVI is that in the presence of snow, NDVI decreases, while EVI increases (Huete, 2002).

Starting 2000, and after the launch of the two MODIS sensors on Terra (satellite) and Aqua (satellite) by NASA, EVI was adopted as a standard product by NASA and became extremely popular with users due to its ability to eliminate background and atmosphere noises, as well as its non saturation, a typical NDVI problem. EVI is currently distributed for free by the USGS LP DAAC.

== Two-band EVI ==
Two reasons drive the search for a two-band EVI:

1. Extending the EVI back in time, using the AVHRR record. The AVHRR sensors lacks a blue band, hence using a three-band EVI version is not possible. This could potentially lead to a 30-year EVI record that complements the NDVI record.
2. The blue band has always been problematic, and its Signal to Noise ratio (S/N) quite poor. This is mainly due to the nature of the reflected energy in this part of the spectrum over land, which is extremely low.

Additionally, the original motivation for the inclusion of the blue band (NDVI uses only NIR and red) in the 1990s was to mitigate atmospheric aerosol interference. However, since that time, sensor level atmospheric adjustment has improved substantially minimizing the marginal impact of blue band on accuracy.

We'll call the two-band EVI "EVI2", and the three-band EVI simply "EVI". A number of EVI2 approaches are available; the one of Jiang et al. 2008 is:

- Define EVI2 as a two-band index in the form of

$$\text{EVI2} = f(\text{Red},\text{NIR}) = G\times {(\text{NIR}-\text{Red}) \over (L+\text{NIR}+C \times \text{Red})}$$

- Find coefficients G, L, and C (organic) to minimize the difference between EVI2 and EVI. They play a similar role to the analogous factors in EVI, but are not actually grounded in physics but found by mathematics.
  - This leads to multiple (infinite) solutions but a few (vaguely physics-based) conditions could be imposed on the solution to generate the best coefficients.
- With MODIS data, we have

$$\text{EVI2} = 2.5 \times {(\text{NIR}-\text{Red}) \over (\text{NIR}+2.4*\text{Red}+1)}$$

Jiang's EVI2 has the best similarity with the 3-band EVI, particularly when atmospheric effects are insignificant and data quality is good. EVI2 can be used for sensors without a blue band, such as the Advanced Very High Resolution Radiometer (AVHRR), and may reveal different vegetation dynamics in comparison with the current AVHRR NDVI dataset.

There exist some other EVI2s, one being that of Miura 2008 for ASTER:

$$\text{EVI2} = 2.4 \times {(\text{NIR}-\text{Red}) \over (\text{NIR}+\text{Red}+1)}$$

The ASTER sensors have a different spectral range compared to the MODIS ones.

== Application of EVI ==
An example of the utility of EVI was reported by Huete et al. (2006). Previously, the Amazon rainforest was viewed as having a monotonous growing season, where there is no particular seasonality to plant growth. Using the MODIS EVI product, Huete et al. showed that the Amazon forest exhibits a distinct increase in growth during the dry season. This phenomenon has implications for our understanding of the carbon cycle and sinks in the region, though it is unclear whether this is a long-standing pattern or an emergent shift associated with climate change.
