= Fraction of absorbed photosynthetically active radiation =

The fraction of absorbed photosynthetically active radiation (FAPAR, sometimes also noted fAPAR or fPAR) is the fraction of the incoming solar radiation in the photosynthetically active radiation spectral region that is absorbed by a photosynthetic organism, typically describing the light absorption across an integrated plant canopy.

This biophysical variable is directly related to the primary productivity of photosynthesis and some models use it to estimate the assimilation of carbon dioxide in vegetation in conjunction with the leaf area index. FAPAR can also be used as an indicator of the state and evolution of the vegetation cover; with this function, it advantageously replaces the Normalized Difference Vegetation Index (NDVI), provided it is itself properly estimated.

FAPAR can be directly measured on the ground, by putting a spectrometer above and below canopy cover. On a larger scale, however, it is estimated from space measurements in the solar spectral range and a number of state of the art algorithms have been proposed to derive this important environmental variable. Currently, there are some remote sensing products of FAPAR, such as AVHRR and MODIS.

FAPAR is one of the 50 Essential Climate Variables recognized by the UN Global Climate Observing System (GCOS) as necessary to characterize the climate of the Earth. GCOS has issued specific recommendations to monitor this variable systematically, both through a reanalysis of existing databases and in the future with current and forthcoming instruments.
