= Normalized difference vegetation index =

Metric quantifying vegetation density

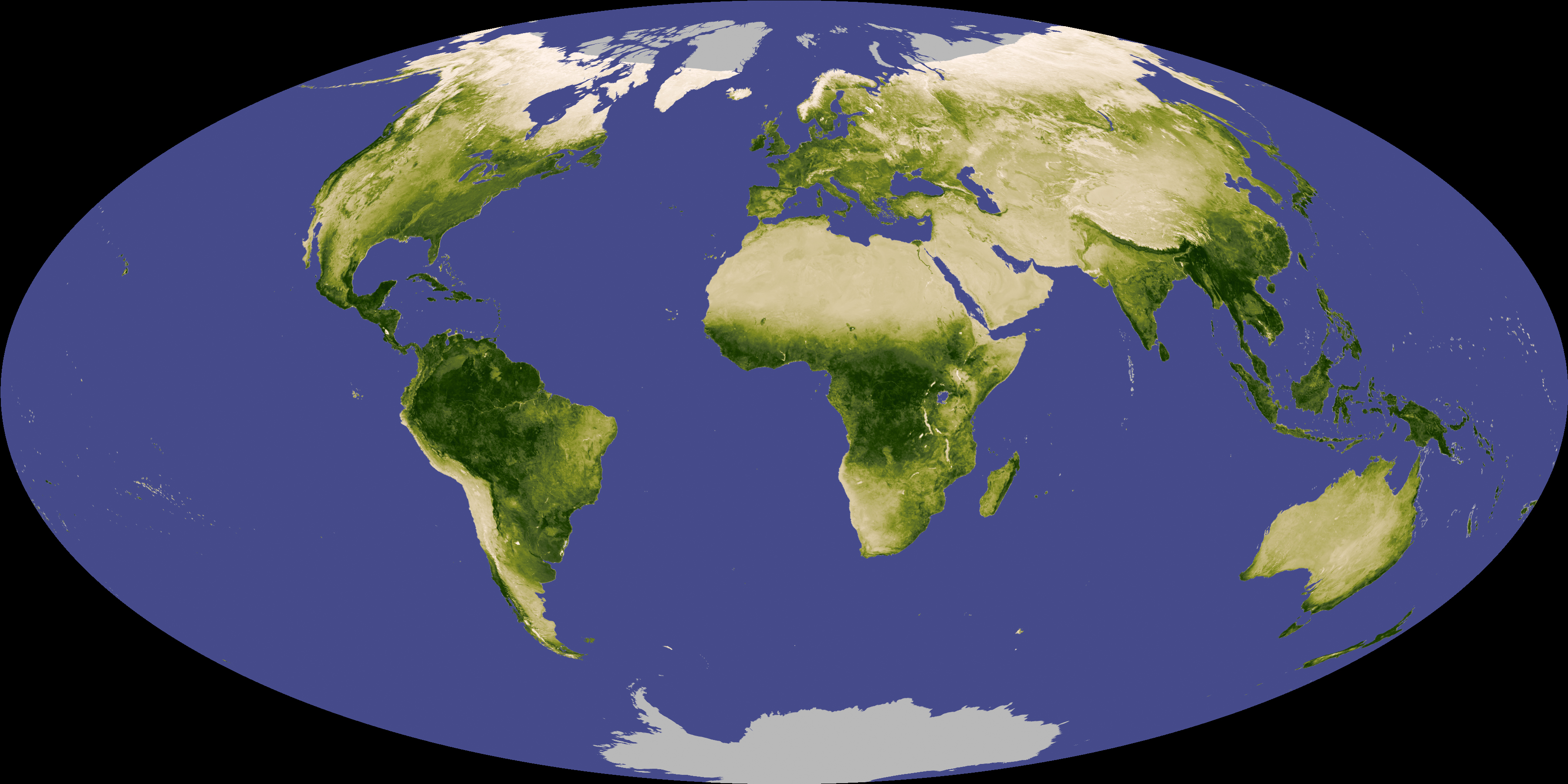
Negative values of NDVI correspond to water. Values close to zero generally correspond to barren areas of rock, sand, or snow. Low positive values represent shrub and grassland (approximately 0.2 0.4), while high positive values indicate temperate and tropical rain-forests (values approaching 1).

The normalized difference vegetation index (NDVI) is a widely used metric for quantifying the health and density of vegetation using sensor data. It is calculated from spectrometric data at two specific bands: red and near-infrared. The spectrometric data is usually sourced from remote sensors, such as satellites.

The metric is popular in industry because of its accuracy. It has a high correlation with the true state of vegetation on the ground. The index is easy to interpret: NDVI will be a value between -1 and 1, where values close to zero will indicate little to no vegetation, negative values are associated with non-land surfaces or water, and higher values correspond to healthy, dense vegetation. It is used in applications such as agriculture, drought monitoring, and ecosystem analysis.

== Brief history ==
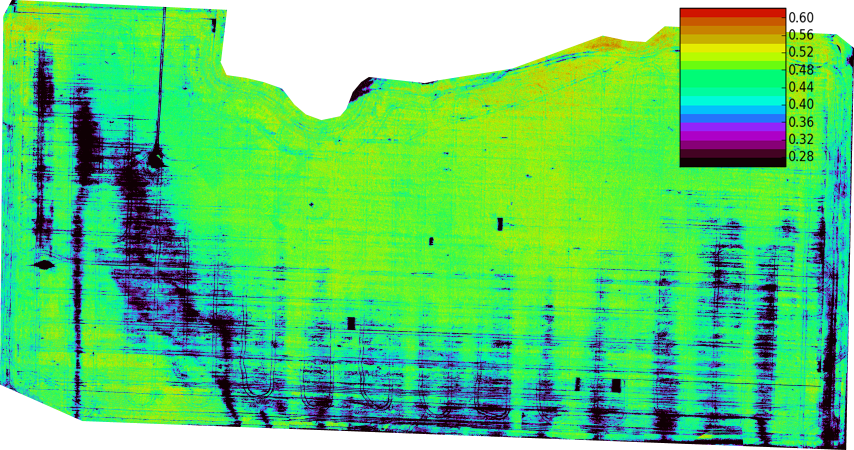
Precision Agriculture NDVI 4 cm / pixel GSD

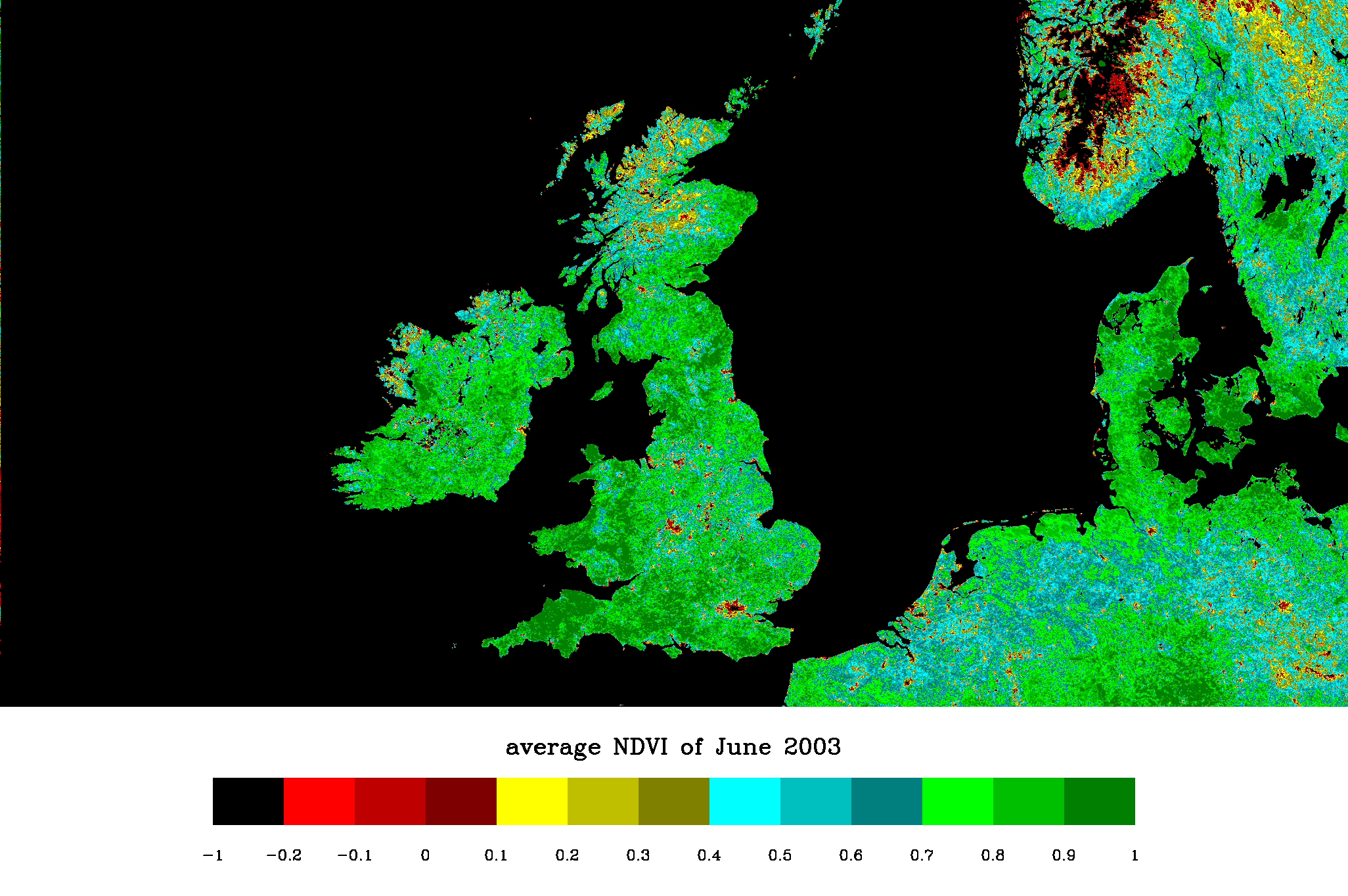
NDVI in June over the British Isles (NOAA AVHRR)

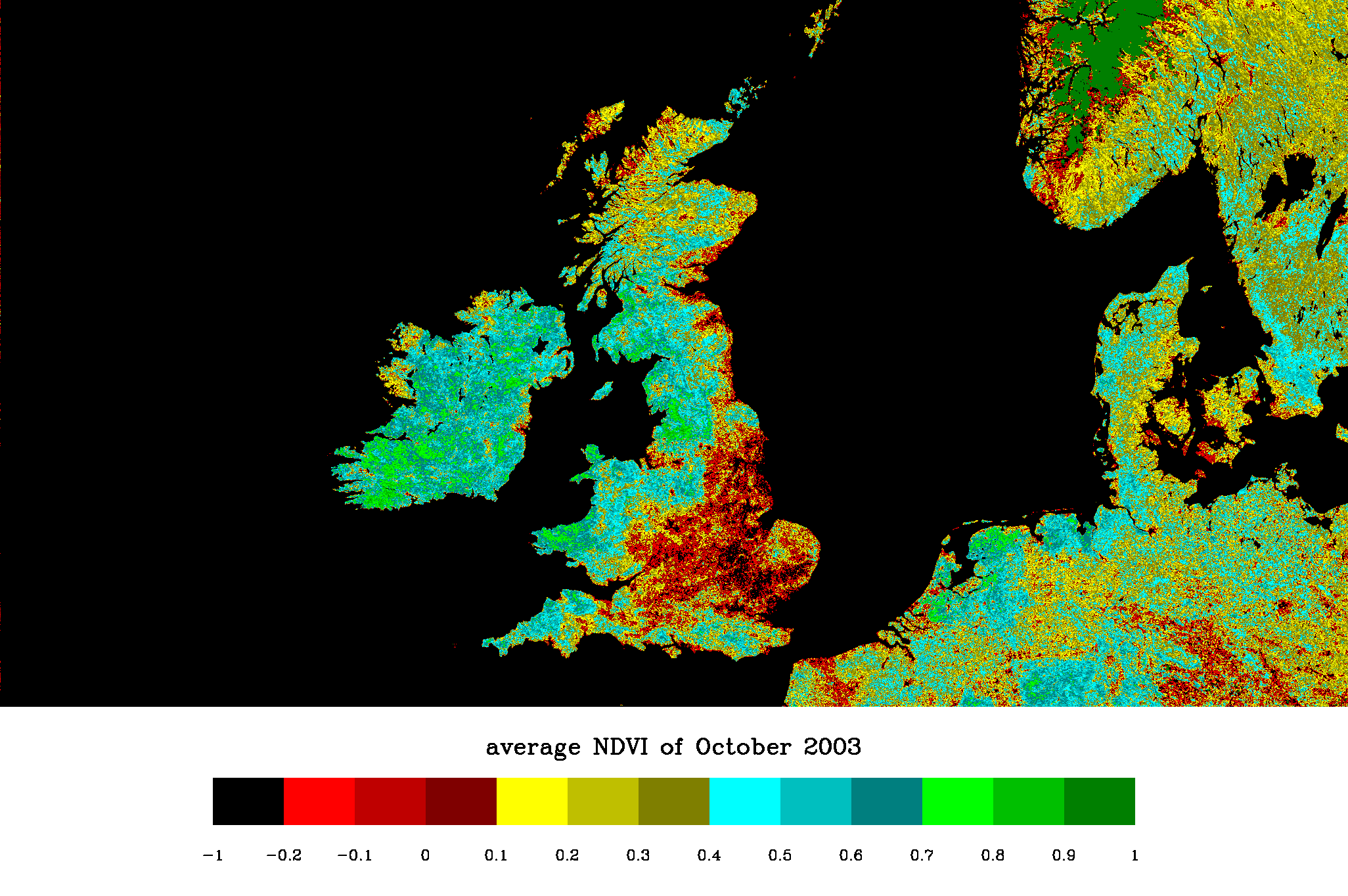
NDVI in October over the British Isles (NOAA AVHRR)

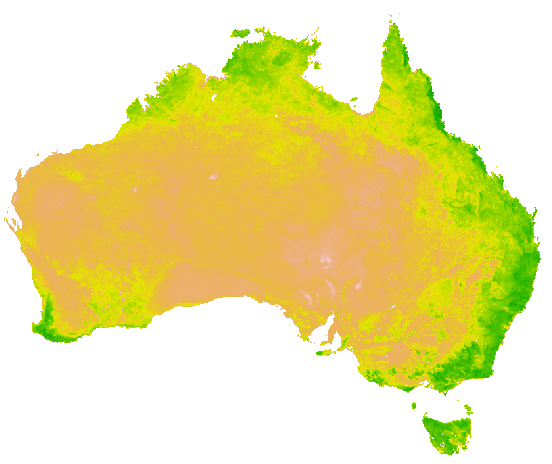
NDVI 6- monthly average for Australia, 1 Dec 2012 to 31 May 2013.

The exploration of outer space started in earnest with the launch of Sputnik 1 by the Soviet Union on 4 October 1957. This was the first man-made satellite orbiting the Earth. Subsequent successful launches, both in the Soviet Union (e.g., the Sputnik and Cosmos programs), and in the U.S. (e.g., the Explorer program), quickly led to the design and operation of dedicated meteorological satellites. These are orbiting platforms embarking instruments specially designed to observe the Earth's atmosphere and surface with a view to improve weather forecasting. Starting in 1960, the TIROS series of satellites embarked television cameras and radiometers. This was later (1964 onwards) followed by the Nimbus satellites and the family of Advanced Very High Resolution Radiometer instruments on board the National Oceanic and Atmospheric Administration (NOAA) platforms. The latter measures the reflectance of the planet in red and near-infrared bands, as well as in the thermal infrared. In parallel, NASA developed the Earth Resources Technology Satellite (ERTS), which became the precursor to the Landsat program. These early sensors had minimal spectral resolution, but tended to include bands in the red and near-infrared, which are useful to distinguish vegetation and clouds, amongst other targets.

With the launch of the first ERTS satellite – which was soon to be renamed Landsat 1 – on July 23, 1972 with its MultiSpectral Scanner (MSS) NASA funded a number of investigations to determine its capabilities for Earth remote sensing. One of those early studies was directed toward examining the spring vegetation green-up and subsequent summer and fall dry-down (the so-called "vernal advancement and retrogradation") throughout the north to south expanse of the Great Plains region of the central U.S. This region covered a wide range of latitudes from the southern tip of Texas to the U.S.-Canada border, which resulted in a wide range of solar zenith angles at the time of the satellite observations.

The researchers for this Great Plains study (PhD student Donald Deering and his advisor Dr. Robert Hass) found that their ability to correlate, or quantify, the biophysical characteristics of the rangeland vegetation of this region from the satellite spectral signals was confounded by these differences in solar zenith angle across this strong latitudinal gradient. With the assistance of a resident mathematician (Dr. John Schell), they studied solutions to this dilemma and subsequently developed the ratio of the difference of the red and infrared radiances over their sum as a means to adjust for or "normalize" the effects of the solar zenith angle. Originally, they called this ratio the "Vegetation Index" (and another variant, the square-root transformation of the difference-sum ratio, the "Transformed Vegetation Index"); but as several other remote sensing researchers were identifying the simple red/infrared ratio and other spectral ratios as the "vegetation index," they eventually began to identify the difference/sum ratio formulation as the normalized difference vegetation index. The earliest reported use of NDVI in the Great Plains study was in 1973 by Rouse et al. (Dr. John Rouse was the Director of the Remote Sensing Center of Texas A&M University where the Great Plains study was conducted). However, they were preceded in formulating a normalized difference spectral index by Kriegler et al. in 1969. Soon after the launch of ERTS-1 (Landsat-1), Compton Tucker of NASA's Goddard Space Flight Center produced a series of early scientific journal articles describing uses of the NDVI.

Thus, NDVI was one of the most successful of many attempts to simply and quickly identify vegetated areas and their "condition," and it remains the most well-known and used index to detect live green plant canopies in multispectral remote sensing data. Once the feasibility to detect vegetation had been demonstrated, users tended to also use the NDVI to quantify the photosynthetic capacity of plant canopies. This, however, can be a rather more complex undertaking if not done properly, as is discussed below.

== Rationale ==
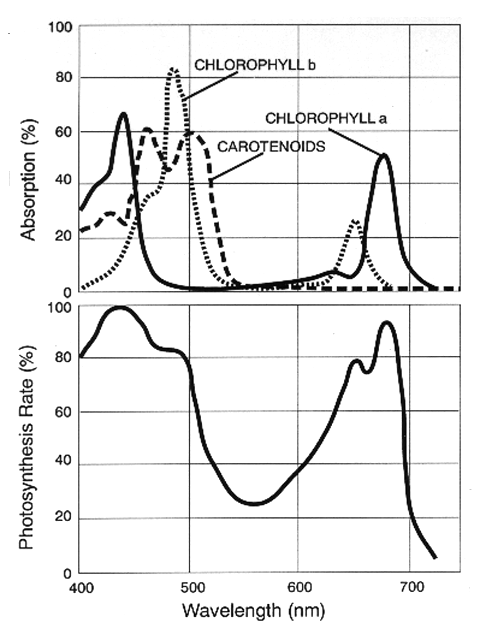
Typical PAR action spectrum, shown beside absorption spectra for chlorophyll-A, chlorophyll-B, and carotenoids

Live green plants absorb solar radiation in the photosynthetically active radiation (PAR) spectral region, which they use as a source of energy in the process of photosynthesis. Leaf cells have also evolved to re-emit solar radiation in the near-infrared spectral region (which carries approximately half of the total incoming solar energy), because the photon energy at wavelengths longer than about 700 nanometers is too low to synthesize organic molecules. A strong absorption at these wavelengths would only result in overheating the plant and possibly damaging the tissues. Hence, live green plants appear relatively dark in the PAR and relatively bright in the near-infrared. By contrast, clouds and snow tend to be rather bright in the red (as well as other visible wavelengths) and quite dark in the near-infrared. The pigment in plant leaves, chlorophyll, strongly absorbs visible light (from 400 to 700 nm) for use in photosynthesis. The cell structure of the leaves, on the other hand, strongly reflects near-infrared light (from 700 to 1100 nm). The more leaves a plant has, the more these wavelengths of light are affected. Since early instruments of Earth Observation, such as NASA's ERTS and NOAA's AVHRR, acquired data in visible and near-infrared, it was natural to exploit the strong differences in plant reflectance to determine their spatial distribution in these satellite images.

The NDVI is calculated from these individual measurements as follows:

$$\mbox{NDVI}=\frac{(\mbox{NIR}-\mbox{Red})}{(\mbox{NIR}+\mbox{Red})}$$

where Red and NIR stand for the spectral reflectance measurements acquired in the red (visible) and near-infrared regions, respectively. These spectral reflectances are themselves ratios of the reflected radiation to the incoming radiation in each spectral band individually, hence they take on values between 0 and 1. By design, the NDVI itself thus varies between -1 and +1. NDVI is functionally, but not linearly, equivalent to the simple infrared/red ratio (NIR/VIS). The advantage of NDVI over a simple infrared/red ratio is therefore generally limited to any possible linearity of its functional relationship with vegetation properties (e.g. biomass). The simple ratio (unlike NDVI) is always positive, which may have practical advantages, but it also has a mathematically infinite range (0 to infinity), which can be a practical disadvantage as compared to NDVI. Also in this regard, note that the VIS term in the numerator of NDVI only scales the result, thereby creating negative values. NDVI is functionally and linearly equivalent to the ratio NIR / (NIR+VIS), which ranges from 0 to 1 and is thus never negative nor limitless in range. But the most important concept in the understanding of the NDVI algebraic formula is that, despite its name, it is a transformation of a spectral ratio (NIR/VIS), and it has no functional relationship to a spectral difference (NIR-VIS).

In general, if there is much more reflected radiation in near-infrared wavelengths than in visible wavelengths, then the vegetation in that pixel is likely to be dense and may contain some type of forest. Subsequent work has shown that the NDVI is directly related to the photosynthetic capacity and hence energy absorption of plant canopies. Although the index can take negative values, even in densely populated urban areas the NDVI usually has a (small) positive value. Negative values are more likely to be observed in the atmosphere and some specific materials.

== Agricultural applications ==
Within precision agriculture, NDVI data is used to assess crop health. Today, this often involves agricultural drones, which are paired with NDVI to compare data and recognize crop health issues. One example of this is agriculture drones from PrecisionHawk and Sentera, which allow agriculturalists to capture and process NDVI data within one day, a change from the traditional NDVI uses and their long lag times. Much of the research done currently has proved that the NDVI images can even be obtained using the normal digital RGB cameras by some modifications in order to obtain the results similar to those obtained from the multispectral cameras and can be implemented effectively in the crop health monitoring systems.

In addition to drones, NDVI is used to monitor crop growth in stages over time, from early growth to maturity, helping to track how vegetation sprouts through its growing season. This data collection helps detect spatial variability within field to check if some areas are growing healthier than others and if their timing is accurate for what stage they should be in. More specifically, farmers use NDVI to track things such as irrigation levels, application of fertilizer, and help reduce their waste and cost. It can estimate leaf area index (LAI), biomass, vegetation cover, which farmers also need to determine crop yield. This includes being able to identify plant stress much sooner than it can be seen. This could include water stress, nutrient deficiencies, or diseases. Since there is a prediction aspect to NDVI, it has been able to be used in yield prediction models since higher NDVI is more often linked to greater productivity/biomass. Using a time-series, NDVI data gives farmers the opportunity to keep track of seasonal trends, compare those to that of previous years and brace for changes in upcoming climate variability that includes more drought or heatwaves.

For example, NDVI can be used to monitor drought by tracking changes in vegetation green over time, where lower values can indicate plant stress due to reduced water availability. This helps in analyzing large-scale ecosystem changes which includes seasonal vegetation cycles and long-term changes caused by climate change and land use change. It also has applications in detecting deforestation and land cover damage since decreases in values often point to vegetation loss or degradation. This data is applied in urban studies to examine the relationship between surface temperature and vegetation cover, more useful in research on urban heat islands.

== Limitations ==
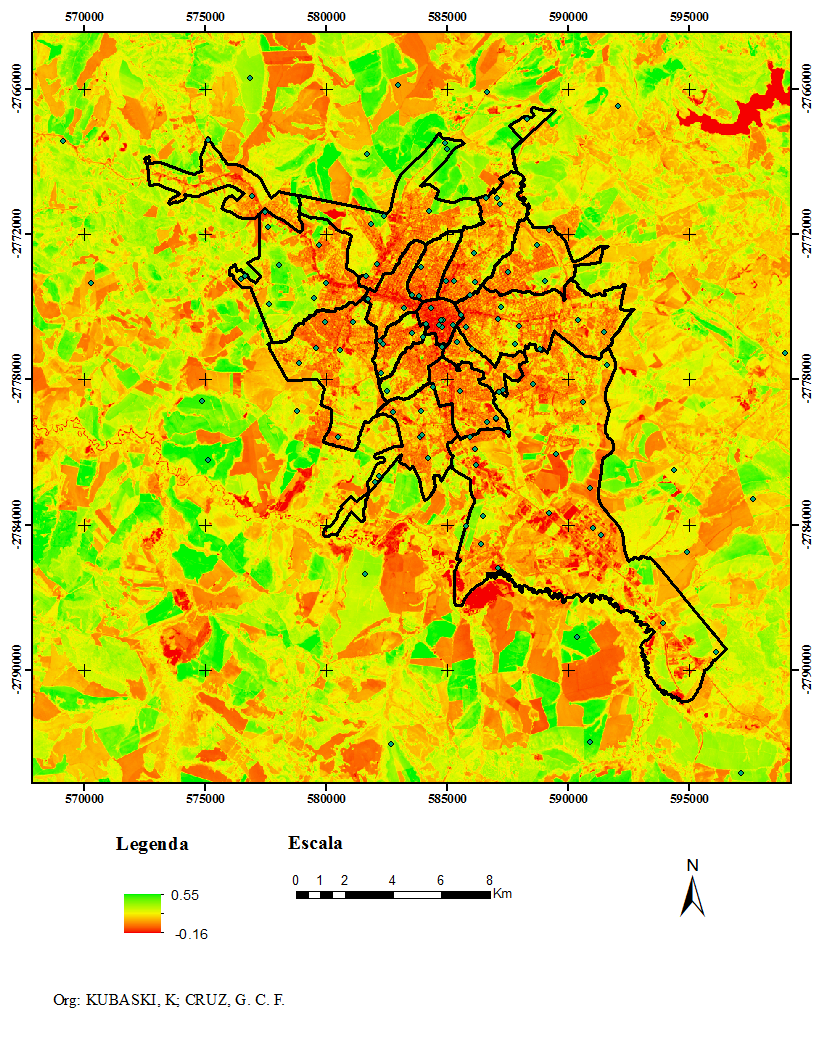
The surrounding fields and water bodies like the dam to the northeast help to mask with high values in Ponta Grossa, southern Brazil

It can be seen from its mathematical definition that the NDVI of an area containing a dense vegetation canopy will tend to positive values (say 0.3 to 0.8) while clouds and snow fields will be characterized by negative values of this index. Other targets on Earth visible from space include:

- free standing water (e.g., oceans, seas, lakes and rivers) which have a rather low reflectance in both spectral bands (at least away from shores) and thus result in very low positive or even slightly negative NDVI values,
- soils which generally exhibit a near-infrared spectral reflectance somewhat larger than the red, and thus tend to also generate rather small positive NDVI values (say 0.1 to 0.2).

In addition to the simplicity of the algorithm and its capacity to broadly distinguish vegetated areas from other surface types, the NDVI also has the advantage of compressing the size of the data to be manipulated by a factor 2 (or more), since it replaces the two spectral bands by a single new field (eventually coded on 8 bits instead of the 10 or more bits of the original data).

The NDVI has been widely used in applications for which it was not originally designed. Using the NDVI for quantitative assessments (as opposed to qualitative surveys as indicated above) raises a number of issues that may seriously limit the actual usefulness of this index if they are not properly addressed. The following subsections review some of these issues.

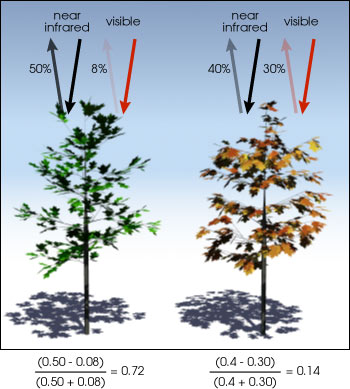
NDVI comparison of healthy vs stressed vegetation using near infrared and visible reflectance

- Mathematically, the sum and the difference of the two spectral channels contain the same information as the original data, but the difference alone (or the normalized difference) carries only part of the initial information. Whether the missing information is relevant or valuable is for the user to judge, but it is important to understand that an NDVI product carries only a fraction of the information available in the original spectral reflectance data.
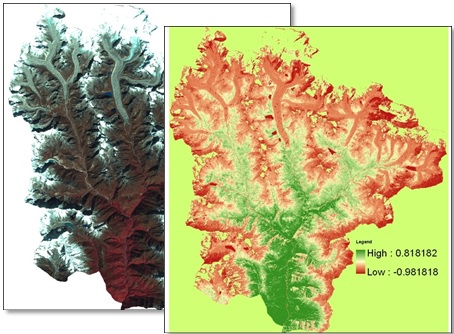
- Generated Normalized Difference Vegetation Index (NDVI) from the satellite images
  Users of NDVI have tended to estimate a large number of vegetation properties from the value of this index. Typical examples include the leaf area index, biomass, chlorophyll concentration in leaves, plant productivity, fractional vegetation cover, accumulated rainfall, etc. Such relations are often derived by correlating space-derived NDVI values with ground-measured values of these variables. This approach raises further issues related to the spatial scale associated with the measurements, as satellite sensors always measure radiation quantities for areas substantially larger than those sampled by field instruments. Furthermore, it is of course illogical to claim that all these relations hold at once, because that would imply that all of these environmental properties would be directly and unequivocally related between themselves.
- The reflectance measurements should be relative to the same area and be acquired simultaneously. This may not be easy to achieve with instruments that acquire different spectral channels through different cameras or focal planes. Mis-registration of the spectral images may lead to substantial errors and unusable results.

Also, the calculation of the NDVI value is sensitive to a number of factors such as atmospheric effects, differences between sensors, soil, ice, or snow conditions, and spatial inconsistency in the data

- Atmospheric effects: The actual composition of the atmosphere (in particular with respect to water vapor and aerosols) can significantly affect the measurements made in space. Hence, the latter may be misinterpreted if these effects are not properly taken into account (as is the case when the NDVI is calculated directly on the basis of raw measurements).
- Clouds: Deep (optically thick) clouds may be quite noticeable in satellite imagery and yield characteristic NDVI values that ease their screening. However, thin clouds (such as the ubiquitous cirrus), or small clouds with typical linear dimensions smaller than the diameter of the area actually sampled by the sensors, can significantly contaminate the measurements. Similarly, cloud shadows in areas that appear clear can affect NDVI values and lead to misinterpretations. These considerations are minimized by forming composite images from daily or near-daily images. Composite NDVI images have led to a large number of new vegetation applications where the NDVI or photosynthetic capacity varies over time.
- Soil effects: Soils tend to darken when wet, so that their reflectance is a direct function of water content. If the spectral response to moistening is not exactly the same in the two spectral bands, the NDVI of an area can appear to change as a result of soil moisture changes (precipitation or evaporation) and not because of vegetation changes.
- Anisotropic effects: All surfaces (whether natural or man-made) reflect light differently in different directions, and this form of anisotropy is generally spectrally dependent, even if the general tendency may be similar in these two spectral bands. As a result, the value of NDVI may depend on the particular anisotropy of the target and on the angular geometry of illumination and observation at the time of the measurements, and hence on the position of the target of interest within the swath of the instrument or the time of passage of the satellite over the site. This is particularly crucial in analyzing AVHRR data since the orbit of the NOAA platforms tended to drift in time. At the same time, the use of composite NDVI images minimizes these considerations and has led to global time series NDVI data sets spanning more than 25 years.
- Spectral effects: Since each sensor has its own characteristics and performances, in particular with respect to the position, width and shape of the spectral bands, a single formula like NDVI yields different results when applied to the measurements acquired by different instruments.
- Modifiable areal unit problem (MAUP): NDVI is ubiquitous as an index of vegetation. Since mapping and monitoring of vegetation takes place via 'big data' image processing systems. These systems may use pixel- or object-based algorithms to assess vegetation health, evapotranspiration, and other ecosystem functions. When a category of vegetation consists of multiple pixels, the calculation of a 'mean' can be a mean of NDVI values for each pixel (pixel-based), or a mean of the Red values and a mean of the NIR values for all the pixels in which the mean NDVI is the ratio of these (object-based). NDVI can suffer from the intractable problems that are associated with MAUP. In particular, a recent study demonstrated that when NDVI mean values are estimated for certain buffer distances, the scale of the analysis can influence NDVI measures due to the presence of scale effects associated with MAUP. Another study demonstrated that MAUP does not significantly impact in case of pure vegetation pixels in an urban environment. A modification known as MAUI-NDVI specifically addresses the problem.

NDVI is a very widely using system, however, it can become hard to interpret due to an oversimplification of more complex surface signals. Satellite data that is used includes a mixture of vegetation, soil, shadows, and the atmosphere itself, so it does not simply represent vegetation. Due to this oversimplification, information can be lost and in fact be misinterpreted of any actual vegetation conditions occurring at the time. Additionally, even if NDVI can cover larger areas, it's hard for it to capture individual plants which causes mismatches in field and satellite data. This makes linking productivity to an area much more uncertain for people like farmers. Differences between sensors and data processing methods can produce slightly different NDVI values making it hard for people to compare datasets from different timescales or platforms. This can also happen with the way people configure their sensor calibration or just how the resolution taken at the time was processed that could produce these changes. With this in mind, because of these limitation, NDVI can only be more reliably used for general vegetation pattern alongside other indices to provide a more accurate analysis and interpretation.

A number of derivatives and alternatives to NDVI have been proposed in the scientific literature to address these limitations, including the Perpendicular Vegetation Index, the soil-adjusted vegetation index, the atmospherically resistant vegetation index and the global environment monitoring index. Each of these attempted to include intrinsic correction(s) for one or more perturbing factors. A current alternative adopted by USGS is the enhanced vegetation index (EVI), correcting for soil effects, canopy background, and aerosol influences.

It is not until the mid-1990s, however, that a new generation of algorithms were proposed to estimate directly the biogeophysical variables of interest (e.g., the fraction of absorbed photosynthetically active radiation, FAPAR), taking advantage of the enhanced performance and characteristics of modern sensors (in particular their multispectral and multiangular capabilities) to take all the perturbing factors into account. In spite of many possible perturbing factors upon the NDVI, it remains a valuable quantitative vegetation monitoring tool when the photosynthetic capacity of the land surface needs to be studied at the appropriate spatial scale for various phenomena.

== See also ==
- Normalized difference red edge index – Metric in biology
- Normalized difference water index – Remote sensing-derived indexes related to liquid water
- Quantitative revolution – Paradigm shift in geography
- Red edge – Region of change in vegetation reflectance
- Revised Simple Biosphere Model (SIB-2)
