= Lyot =

Lyot may refer to:

- Bernard Lyot, French astronomer
- Lyot filter
- Lyot stop
- Lyot depolarizer
- Lyot (lunar crater)
- Lyot (Martian crater)
- 2452 Lyot, asteroid
- Bernard Lyot Telescope
