= Univariate =

Involving a single variable

In mathematics, a univariate object is an expression, equation, function or polynomial involving only one variable. Objects involving more than one variable are multivariate. In some cases the distinction between the univariate and multivariate cases is fundamental; for example, the fundamental theorem of algebra and Euclid's algorithm for polynomials are fundamental properties of univariate polynomials that cannot be generalized to multivariate polynomials.

In statistics, a univariate distribution characterizes one variable, although it can be applied in other ways as well. For example, univariate data are composed of a single scalar component. In time series analysis, the whole time series is the "variable": a univariate time series is the series of values over time of a single quantity. Correspondingly, a "multivariate time series" characterizes the changing values over time of several quantities. In some cases, the terminology is ambiguous, since the values within a univariate time series may be treated using certain types of multivariate statistical analyses and may be represented using multivariate distributions.

In addition to the question of scaling, a criterion (variable) in univariate statistics can be described by two important measures (also key figures or parameters): Location & Variation.

- Measures of Location Scales (e.g. mode, median, arithmetic mean) describe in which area the data is arranged centrally.
- Measures of Variation (e.g. span, interquartile distance, standard deviation) describe how similar or different the data are scattered.

== See also ==
- Arity
- Bivariate
- Multivariate
- Univariate analysis
- Univariate binary model
- Univariate distribution
