= Multivariate =

Multivariate is the quality of having multiple variables.

It may also refer to:

== In mathematics ==
- Multivariable calculus
- Multivariate function
- Multivariate polynomial
- Multivariate interpolation
- Multivariate optimization

== In computing ==
- Multivariate cryptography
- Multivariate division algorithm
- Multivariate optical computing

== In statistics ==
- Multivariate analysis
- Multivariate random variable
- Multivariate regression
- Multivariate statistics

== See also ==
- Univariate
- Bivariate (disambiguation)
