= Lyot stop =

A Lyot stop (also called a glare stop) is an optical stop, invented by French astronomer Bernard Lyot, that reduces the amount of flare caused by diffraction of other stops and baffles in optical systems.

Lyot stops are located at images of the system's entrance pupil and have a diameter slightly smaller than the pupil's image. Examples of applications can be found in Ref.

== See also ==
- Lyot filter
- Lyot depolarizer
- Coronagraph
