= Liquid crystal tunable filter =

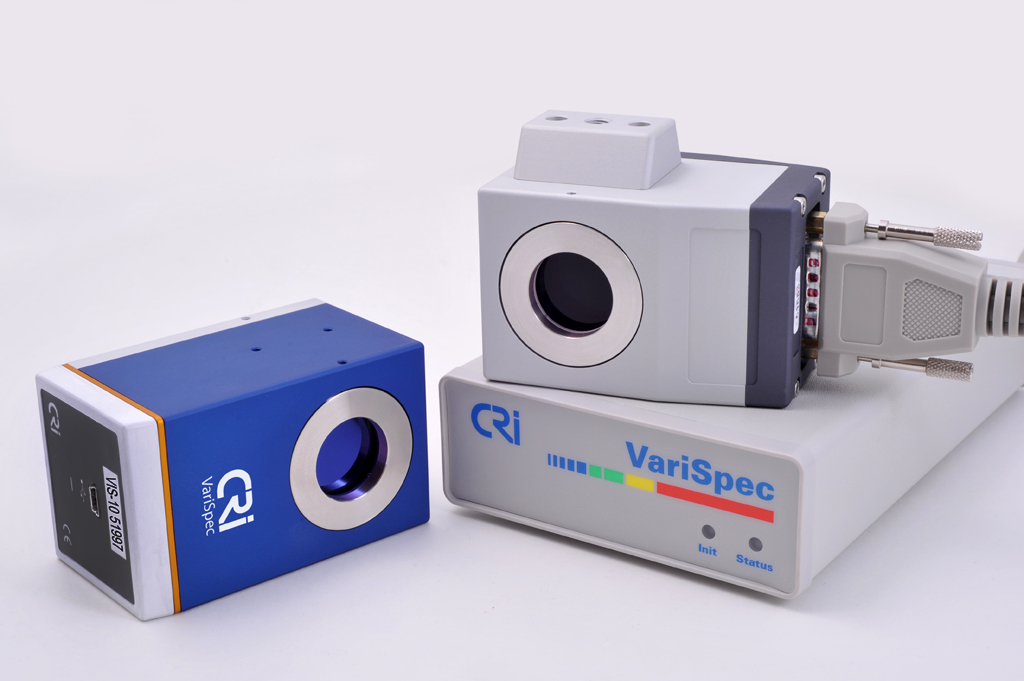
LCTFs circa 2014 with integrated circuitry for control and power (left), or an older model with a separate electronics controller box and thick, shielded cable (right).

A liquid crystal tunable filter (LCTF) is an optical filter that uses electronically controlled liquid crystal (LC) elements to transmit a selectable wavelength of light and exclude others. Often, the basic working principle is based on the Lyot filter but many other designs can be used. The main difference with the original Lyot filter is that the fixed wave plates are replaced by switchable liquid crystal wave plates.

== Optical systems ==
LCTFs enable high image quality and allowing relatively easy integration with regard to optical system design and software control. However, they emit lower peak transmission values in comparison with conventional fixed-wavelength optical filters due to the use of multiple polarizing elements. This can be mitigated in some instances by using wider bandpass designs, since wider bandpass results in more light traveling through the filter. Some LCTFs are designed to tune to a limited number of fixed wavelengths such as the red, green, and blue (RGB) colors while others can be tuned in small increments over a wide range of wavelengths such as the visible or near-infrared spectrum from 400 to the current limit of 2450 nm. The tuning speed of LCTFs varies by manufacturer and design but is generally several tens of milliseconds, mainly determined by the switching speed of the liquid crystal elements. Higher temperatures can decrease the transition time for the molecules of the liquid crystal material to align themselves and for the filter to tune to a particular wavelength. Lower temperatures increase the viscosity of the liquid crystal material and increase the tuning time of the filter from one wavelength to another.

Recent advances in miniaturized electronic driver circuitry have reduced the size requirement of LCTF enclosures without sacrificing large working aperture sizes. In addition, new materials have allowed the effective wavelength range to be extended to 2450 nm.

== Imaging ==
LCTFs are often used in multispectral imaging or hyperspectral imaging systems because of their high image quality and rapid tuning over a broad spectral range. Multiple LCTFs in separate imaging paths can be used in optical designs when the required wavelength range exceeds the capabilities of a single filter, such as in astronomy applications.

LCTFs have been utilized for aerospace imaging. They can be found integrated into compact but high-performance scientific digital imaging cameras as well as industrial- and military-grade instruments (multispectral and high-resolution color imaging systems). LCTFs can have a long lifespan, usually up to at least 45 years. Environmental factors that can cause degradation of filters are extended exposure to high heat and humidity, thermal and/or mechanical shock (most, but not all, LCTFs utilize standard window glass as the principal base material), and long-term exposure to high photonic energy such as ultraviolet light which can photobleach some of the materials used to construct the filters.

== Acousto optic tunable filter ==
Another type of solid-state tunable filter is the acousto-optic tunable filter (AOTF), based on the principles of the acousto-optic modulator. Compared with LCTFs, AOTFs enjoy a much faster tuning speed (microseconds versus milliseconds) and broader wavelength ranges. However, since they rely on the acousto-optic effect of sound waves to diffract and shift the frequency of light, imaging quality is comparatively poor, and the optical design requirements are more stringent. Indeed, LCTFs are capable of diffraction-limited imaging onto high-resolution imaging sensors. AOTFs have smaller apertures and have narrower angle-of-acceptance specifications compared with LCTFs that can have working aperture sizes up to 35mm and can be placed into positions where light rays travel through the filter at angles of over 7 degrees from the normal.

== See also ==
- Machine vision
- Multivariate optical computing
- Optical microscopy
- Preclinical imaging
- Remote sensing
