= Coronagraph =

Telescopic attachment designed to block out the direct light from a star

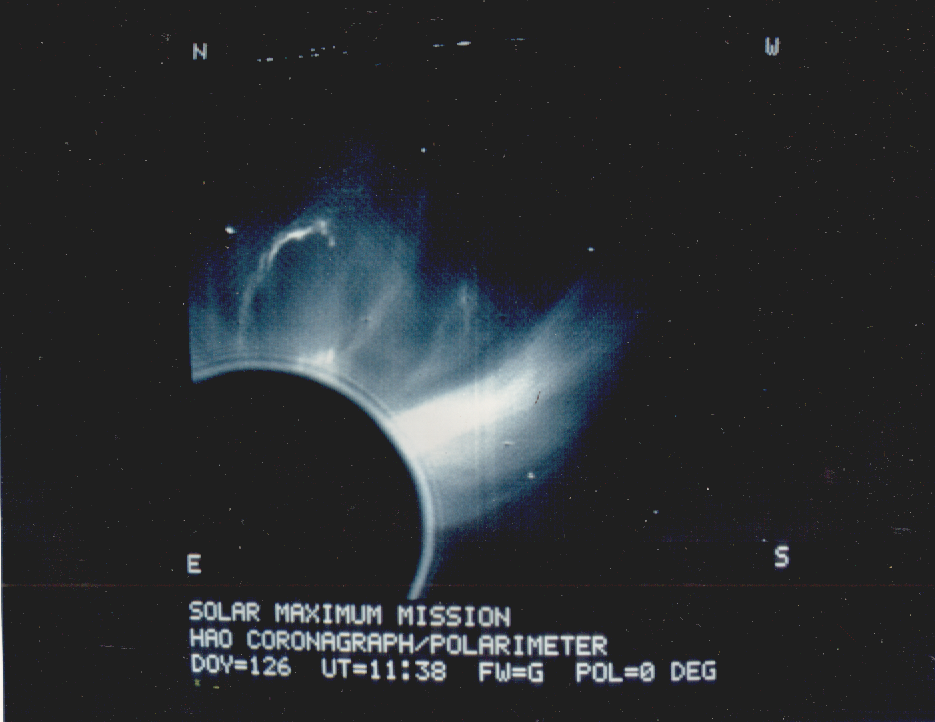
Coronagraph image of the Sun

A coronagraph is a telescopic attachment designed to block out the direct light from a star or other bright object so that nearby objects – which otherwise would be hidden in the object's bright glare – can be resolved. Most coronagraphs are intended to view the corona of the Sun, but a new class of conceptually similar instruments (called stellar coronagraphs to distinguish them from solar coronagraphs) are being used to find extrasolar planets and circumstellar disks around nearby stars as well as host galaxies in quasars and other similar objects with active galactic nuclei (AGN).

== Invention ==
The coronagraph was introduced in 1931 by the French astronomer Bernard Lyot; since then, coronagraphs have been used at many solar observatories. Coronagraphs operating within Earth's atmosphere suffer from scattered light in the sky itself, due primarily to Rayleigh scattering of sunlight in the upper atmosphere. At view angles close to the Sun, the sky is much brighter than the background corona even at high altitude sites on clear, dry days. Ground-based coronagraphs, such as the High Altitude Observatory's Mark IV Coronagraph on top of Mauna Loa, use polarization to distinguish sky brightness from the image of the corona: both coronal light and sky brightness are scattered sunlight and have similar spectral properties, but the coronal light is Thomson-scattered at nearly a right angle and therefore undergoes scattering polarization, while the superimposed light from the sky near the Sun is scattered at only a glancing angle and hence remains nearly unpolarized.

== Design ==
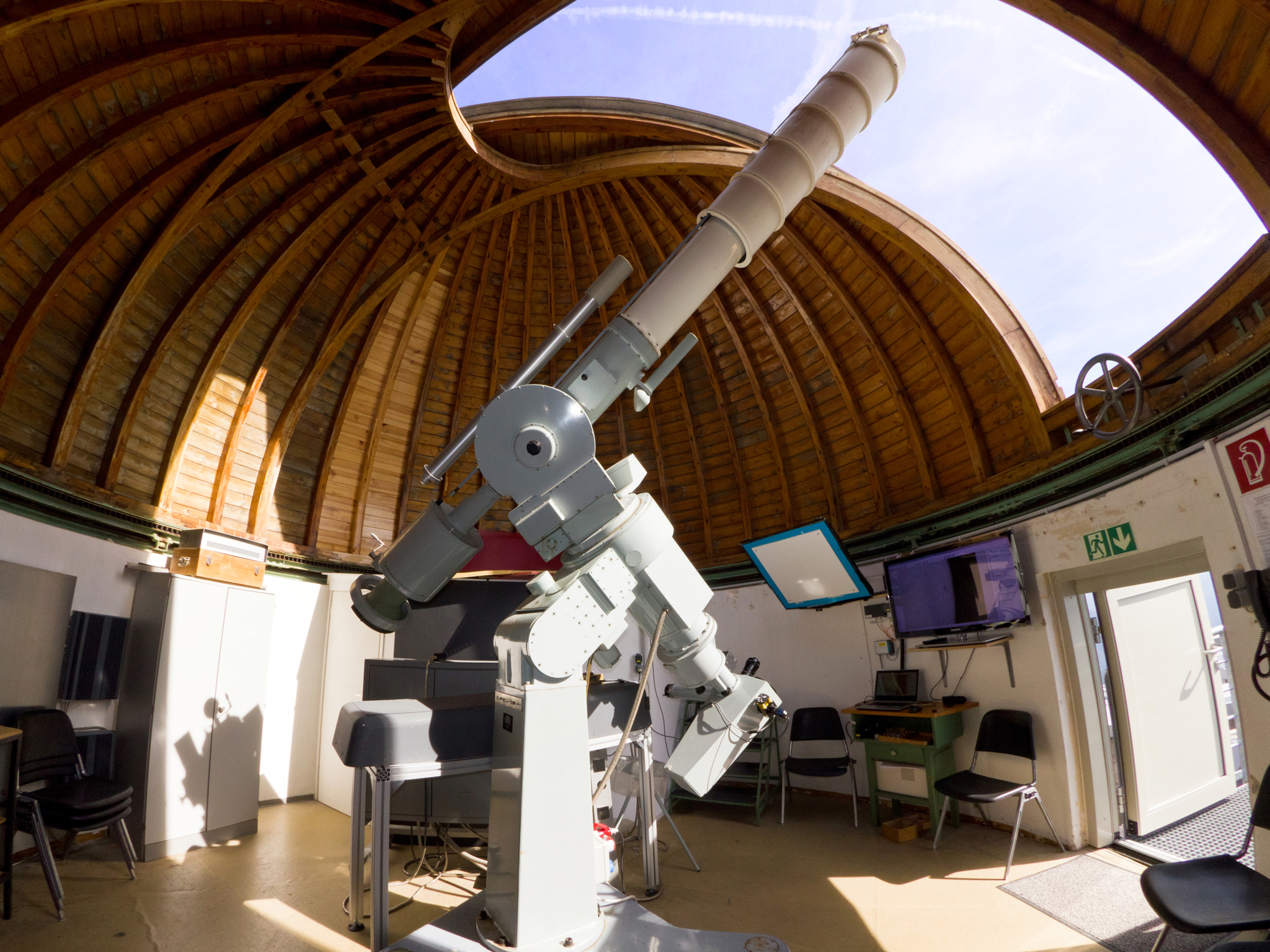
Coronagraph at the Wendelstein Observatory

Coronagraph instruments are extreme examples of stray light rejection and precise photometry because the total brightness of the solar corona is less than one millionth that of the Sun's disk. The apparent surface brightness is even fainter because, in addition to delivering less total light, the corona has a much greater apparent size than the Sun itself.

During a total solar eclipse, the Moon acts as an occluding disk and any camera in the eclipse path may be operated as a coronagraph until the eclipse is over. More common is an arrangement where the sky is imaged onto an intermediate focal plane containing an opaque spot; this focal plane is reimaged onto a detector. Another arrangement is to image the sky onto a mirror with a small hole: the desired light is reflected and eventually reimaged, but the unwanted light from the star goes through the hole and does not reach the detector. Either way, the instrument design must take into account scattering and diffraction to make sure that as little unwanted light as possible reaches the final detector. Lyot's key invention was an arrangement of lenses with stops, known as Lyot stops, and baffles such that light scattered by diffraction was focused on the stops and baffles, where it could be absorbed, while light needed for a useful image missed them.

As examples, imaging instruments on the Hubble Space Telescope and James Webb Space Telescope offer coronagraphic capability.

=== Band-limited coronagraph ===
A band-limited coronagraph uses a special kind of mask called a band-limited mask. This mask is designed to block light and also manage diffraction effects caused by removal of the light. The band-limited coronagraph has served as the baseline design for the canceled Terrestrial Planet Finder coronagraph. Band-limited masks are available on the James Webb Space Telescope as well.

=== Phase-mask coronagraph ===
A phase-mask coronagraph (such as the so-called four-quadrant phase-mask coronagraph) uses a transparent mask to shift the phase of the stellar light in order to create a self-destructive interference, rather than a simple opaque disc to block it.

=== Optical vortex coronagraph ===
An optical vortex coronagraph uses a phase-mask in which the phase shift varies azimuthally around the center. Several varieties of optical vortex coronagraphs exist:

- the scalar optical vortex coronagraph based on a phase ramp directly etched in a dielectric material, like fused silica.
- the vector(ial) vortex coronagraph employs a mask that rotates the angle of polarization of photons, and ramping this angle of rotation has the same effect as ramping a phase-shift. A mask of this kind can be synthesized by various technologies, ranging from liquid crystal polymer (same technology as in 3D television), and micro-structured surfaces (using microfabrication technologies from the microelectronics industry). Such a vector vortex coronagraph made out of liquid crystal polymers is currently in use at the 200-inch Hale Telescope at the Palomar Observatory. It has recently been operated with adaptive optics to image extrasolar planets.

This works with stars other than the sun because they are so far away their light is, for this purpose, a spatially coherent plane wave. The coronagraph using interference masks out the light along the center axis of the telescope, but allows the light from off-axis objects through.

== Satellite-based coronagraphs ==
Coronagraphs in outer space are much more effective than the same instruments would be if located on the ground. This is because the complete absence of atmospheric scattering eliminates the largest source of glare present in a terrestrial coronagraph. Several space missions such as NASA-ESA's SOHO, and NASA's SPARTAN, Solar Maximum Mission, and Skylab have used coronagraphs to study the outer reaches of the solar corona. The Hubble Space Telescope (HST) is able to perform coronagraphy using the Near Infrared Camera and Multi-Object Spectrometer (NICMOS), and the James Webb Space Telescope (JWST) is able to perform coronagraphy using the Near Infrared Camera (NIRCam) and Mid-Infrared Instrument (MIRI). The PROBA-3 mission, launched in 2024, used a separate spacecraft as a free-flying external occulter.

While space-based coronagraphs such as LASCO avoid the sky brightness problem, they face design challenges in stray light management under the stringent size and weight requirements of space flight. Any sharp edge (such as the edge of an occulting disk or optical aperture) causes Fresnel diffraction of incoming light around the edge, which means that the smaller instruments that one would want on a satellite unavoidably leak more light than larger ones would. The LASCO C-3 coronagraph uses both an external occulter (which casts shadow on the instrument) and an internal occulter (which blocks stray light that is Fresnel-diffracted around the external occulter) to reduce this leakage, and a complicated system of baffles to eliminate stray light scattering off the internal surfaces of the instrument itself.

=== Aditya-L1 ===
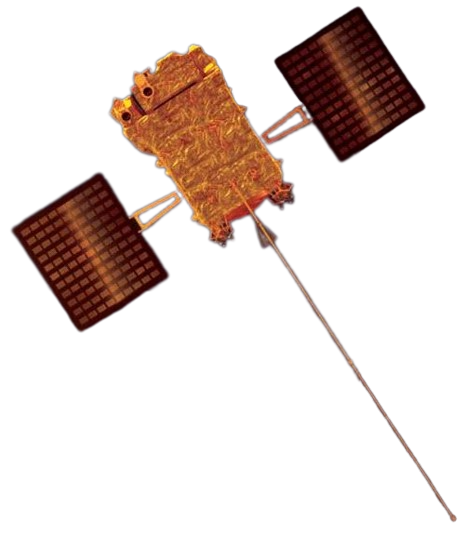
Aditya-L1

Aditya-L1 is a coronagraphy spacecraft developed by the Indian Space Research Organisation (ISRO) and various Indian research institutes. The spacecraft aims to study the solar atmosphere and its impact on the Earth's environment. It will be positioned approximately 1.5 million km from Earth in a halo orbit around the L1 Lagrangian point between Earth and the Sun.

The primary payload, Visible Emission Line Coronagraph (VELC), will send 1,440 images of the sun daily to ground stations. The VELC payload has been developed by the Indian Institute of Astrophysics (IIA) and will continuously observe the Sun's corona from the L1 point.

== Extrasolar planets ==
The coronagraph has recently been adapted to the challenging task of finding planets around nearby stars. While stellar and solar coronagraphs are similar in concept, they are quite different in practice because the object to be occulted differs by a factor of a million in linear apparent size. (The Sun has an apparent size of about 1900 arcseconds, while a typical nearby star might have an apparent size of 0.0005 and 0.002 arcseconds.) Earth-like exoplanet detection requires 10^{−10} contrast. To achieve such contrast requires extreme optothermal stability.

A stellar coronagraph concept was studied for flight on the canceled Terrestrial Planet Finder mission. On ground-based telescopes, a stellar coronagraph can be combined with adaptive optics to search for planets around nearby stars.

In November 2008, NASA announced that a planet was directly observed orbiting the nearby star Fomalhaut. The planet could be seen clearly on images taken by Hubble's Advanced Camera for Surveys' coronagraph in 2004 and 2006. The dark area hidden by the coronagraph mask can be seen on the images, and a bright dot has been added to represent the location of the star itself.

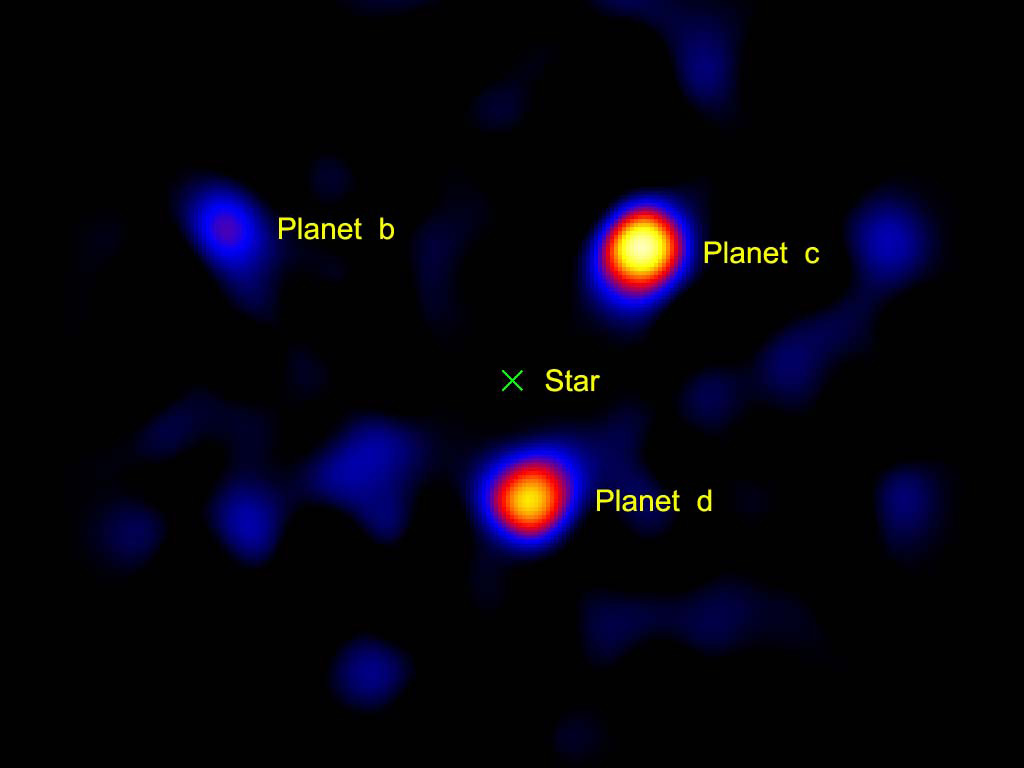
Direct image of exoplanets around the star HR8799 using a vector vortex coronagraph on a 1.5 m portion of the Hale Telescope

Up until the year 2010, telescopes could only directly image exoplanets under exceptional circumstances. Specifically, it is easier to obtain images when the planet is especially large (considerably larger than Jupiter), widely separated from its parent star, and hot so that it emits intense infrared radiation. However, in 2010 a team from NASA's Jet Propulsion Laboratory demonstrated that a vector vortex coronagraph could enable small telescopes to directly image planets. They did this by imaging the previously imaged HR 8799 planets using just a 1.5 m portion of the Hale Telescope.

== See also ==
- List of solar telescopes
- New Worlds Mission – A proposed external coronagraph
- PROBA-3 - a coronagraphy demonstration mission using high-precision formation flying
