= Multivariate optical element =

A multivariate optical element (MOE), is the key part of a multivariate optical computer; an alternative to conventional spectrometry for the chemical analysis of materials.

It is helpful to understand how light is processed in a multivariate optical computer, as compared to how it is processed in a spectrometer. For example, if we are studying the composition of a powder mixture using diffuse reflectance, a suitable light source is directed at the powder mixture and light is collected, usually with a lens, after it has scattered from the powder surface. Light entering a spectrometer first strikes a device (either a grating or interferometer) that separates light of different wavelengths to be measured. A series of independent measurements is used to estimate the full spectrum of the mixture, and the spectrometer renders a measurement of the spectral intensity at many wavelengths. Multivariate statistics can then be applied to the spectrum produced.

In contrast, when using multivariate optical computing, the light entering the instrument strikes an application specific multivariate optical element, which is uniquely tuned to the pattern that needs to be measured using multivariate analysis.

This system can produce the same result that multivariate analysis of a spectrum would produce. Thus, it can generally produce the same accuracy as laboratory grade spectroscopic systems, but with the fast speed inherent with a pure, passive, optical computer. The multivariate optical computer makes use of optical computing to realize the performance of a full spectroscopic system using traditional multivariate analysis. A side benefit is that the throughput and efficiency of the system is higher than conventional spectrometers, which increases the speed of analysis by orders of magnitude.

While each chemical problem presents its own unique challenges and opportunities, the design of a system for a specific analysis is complex and requires the assembly of several pieces of a spectroscopic puzzle. The data necessary for a successful design are spectral characteristics of light sources, detectors and a variety of optics to be used in the final assemblage, dispersion characteristics of the materials used in the wavelength range of interest, and a set of calibrated sample spectra for pattern-recognition-based analysis. With these pieces assembled, suitable application specific multivariate optical computer designs can be generated and the performance accurately modeled and predicted.

== See also ==
- Optical computer
