= Lyot filter =

Astronomical spectral light processor

A Lyot filter (polarization-interference monochromator, birefringent filter), named for its inventor and French astronomer Bernard Lyot, is a type of optical filter that uses birefringence to produce a narrow passband of transmitted wavelengths. Lyot filters are used in astronomy, particularly for solar astronomy, lasers, biomedical photonics and Raman chemical imaging.

== Basic principles ==
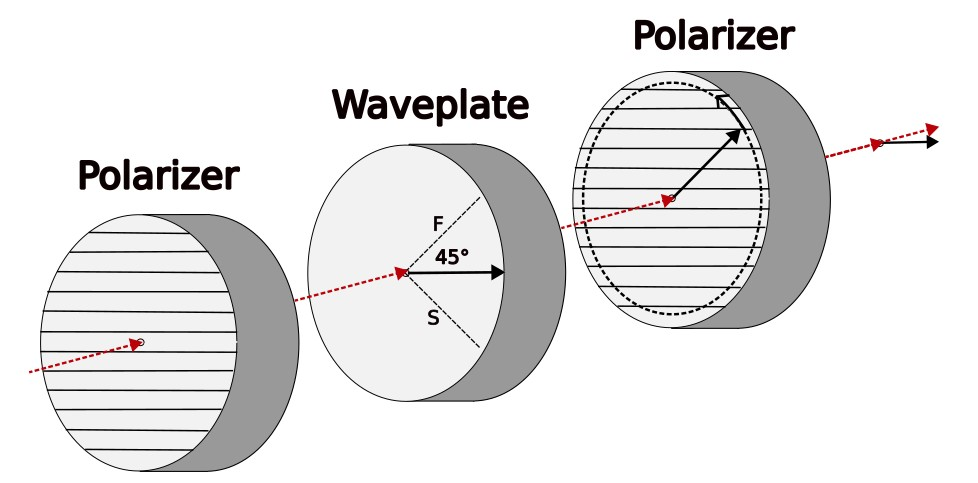
The light's path (red dashed line) through a single-plate Lyot filter. The first polarizer transmits horizontally polarized light to the waveplate. The waveplate's fast (F) and slow (S) transmission directions make a 45-degree angle to the horizontal. For the wavelength in this example, the waveplate transforms the light's horizontal polarization to a circular polarization. The second polarizer transmits only part of the light, the horizontal component of the circularly polarized light, leading to a wavelength dependent amount of light transmission.

This section describes how the Lyot filter's wavelength dependent transmission of light arises from birefringence.

=== Single-plate optical filter ===
The Lyot filter relies on light's polarization property, a vector (Jones vector) perpendicular to light's path that has a fixed direction (linear polarization) or a time-varying rotating direction (circular or elliptical polarization). For a typical single-plate Lyot filter, light passes through three consecutive optical elements that modify the light's polarization: the first horizontal polarizer, a waveplate (retarder) and a second horizontal polarizer. Linearly polarized light travels fastest when aligned with the waveplate's fast F direction, and slowest when aligned with the waveplate's orthogonal slow S direction. The speed difference depends on the difference between the waveplate's ordinary refractive index and extraordinary refractive index. This example assumes that the horizontal makes a 45-degree angle with the waveplate's F and S directions.

The first horizontal polarizer transforms the incoming light's polarization to horizontally polarized light by passing only the incoming light's horizontal polarization component. The waveplate may modify the incoming horizontally polarized light to a different polarization based on the light's wavelength. The second horizontal polarizer passes only the horizontal polarization component of the light exiting the waveplate. For example, at one wavelength, if the light exiting the waveplate is horizontally polarized, then the light passes through the second horizontal polarizer fully, exiting the optical filter with no attenuation. At a different wavelength, if the light exiting the waveplate is vertically polarized, then no light passes through the second horizontal polarizer, and no light exits the optical filter. At most wavelengths, some wavelength-dependent attenuation will occur.

This single-plate optical filter transmits light intensity $I_{T}$ from an input of horizontally polarized light intensity $I_{X}$ with wavelength $\lambda$, waveplate thickness $d$, waveplate ordinary refractive index $n_{o}$ and waveplate extraordinary refractive index $n_{e}$:

$$I_{T}=I_{X} \cdot \operatorname{cos}^{2} \left( \frac{\pi (n_{o}-n_{e}) d}{\lambda} \right)$$

=== Multiplate optical filter ===
Multiplate filters are a series of consecutive single-plate filters, with each waveplate half the thickness of the preceding plate. Using this design, a graph describing the transmitted light intensity at each wavelength will show sharper major peaks (narrower bandwidth) of transmitted light and a greater wavelength interval between the major peaks of transmitted light (free spectral range). As an example, extending the single-plate equation to a 3-plate optical filter with maximum waveplate thickness $d$, this multiplate optical filter transmits light intensity $I_{T}$ from an input of horizontally polarized light intensity $I_{X}$:

$$I_{T}=I_{X} \cdot \operatorname{cos}^{2} \left( \frac{2 \pi (n_{o}-n_{e}) d}{2 \lambda} \right) \cdot \operatorname{cos}^{2} \left( \frac{2 \pi (n_{o}-n_{e}) d}{2^{2} \lambda} \right) \cdot \operatorname{cos}^{2} \left( \frac{2 \pi (n_{o}-n_{e}) d}{2^{3} \lambda} \right)$$

== Design features ==
The waveplates are commonly quartz or calcite. Rotating the waveplate may shift the wavelength of the transmission peaks. Splitting the crystals in half and adding a 1/2 waveplate in the middle increases the filter's field of view. The separation and narrowness of the transmission peaks depends on the number, thicknesses, and orientation of the plates. Due to the temperature dependent birefringent properties of quartz and calcite, the Lyot filter requires a thermostat to minimize temperature fluctuations.

== Tunable filters ==
An electrically tunable Lyot filter contains tuneable electro-optic or liquid crystal birefringent elements. The tunable electro-optic Lyot filter uses lead magnesium niobate-lead titanate (PMN-PT) opto-ceramic to tune the filter. Liquid crystal tunable filters allow analog tuning of the transmitted wavelength by carefully adjusting the voltage over the liquid crystal cells. Liquid crystal Lyot filter spectral bandpass may range from 30 nm to 0.05 nm. The two categories of Lyot liquid crystal filters are polarizing interference retardance filters and electro-optical photonic crystals. Often these filters are based on the original Lyot design, but many other designs exist in order to achieve other properties such as narrow or broad band transmission, or polarization selectivity.

== Comparative performance ==
The Lyot filter and Fabry-Perót filter are the most common tunable electro-optic filters. In comparison to the Fabry-Perót filter, the tunable Lyot filter has broader and more stable adjustable range, but the Lyot filter transmits less light. Poor transmittance occurs due to the large number of highly absorbing polarizers and imperfect waveplate action. Lyot filters may contain up to 12 individual filters, making the Lyot filter expensive, limiting its use in compact instruments. In contrast to Lyot filters, the Solc filter relies on only two polarizers, leading to less light reduction.

== Applications ==
In solar astronomy, viewing the sun's chromosphere, the sun's second atmospheric layer, requires narrowband optical filters (spectroheliograph), such as a Lyot filter, using wavelengths for viewing solar flares, prominences, filaments, and plages arising from calcium and hydrogen.

Single- and multi-plate Lyot filters are often used inside the optical cavity of lasers to allow tuning of the laser. In this case, Brewster losses from the plate and other intracavity elements are usually sufficient to produce the polarizing effect, and no additional polarizers are required. Lyot filters are used also in broadband Ti—sapphire lasers, and dye laser oscillators for wavelength selection.

Although their mechanisms are different, modelocking lasers and Lyot-filter lasers both produce a comb of multiple wavelengths which can be placed on the ITU channel grid for dense wave division multiplexing (DWDM) or used to give each suburban home its own return-signal laser wavelength in a passive optical network (PON) used to provide FTTH (Fiber To The Home).

Another application has been use of Lyot filters is for Raman chemical imaging. Other applications have been in microspectrometer and hyperspectral imaging devices and biomedical photonics.

== See also ==
- Lyot stop
- Lyot depolarizer
- Liquid crystal tunable filter
