= Lyot (Martian crater) =

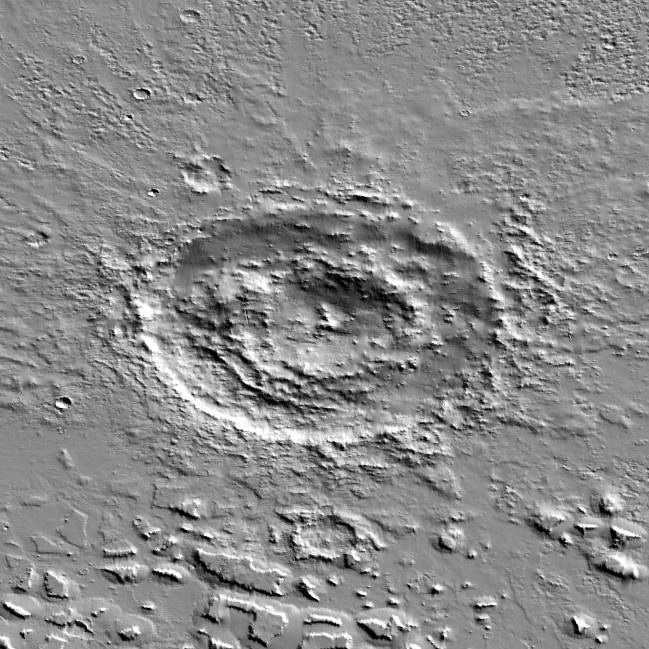
- Shaded relief topographic map of Lyot
- Planet: Mars
- Region: Ismenius Lacus quadrangle
- Coordinates: 50.8°N 330.7°W
- Quadrangle: Ismenius Lacus
- Diameter: 236 km (147 mi)
- Eponym: Bernard Lyot, French astronomer (1897–1952)

Lyot is a large peak ring crater in the Vastitas Borealis region of Mars, located at 50.8° north latitude and 330.7° west longitude within the Ismenius Lacus quadrangle. It is 236 km in diameter. Its name refers to Bernard Lyot, a French astronomer (1897–1952).

Lyot crater, featuring a central peak in the middle, stands out on the flat plains of Vastitas Borealis, which is generally flat and smooth with few large craters. Lyot is the deepest point in the northern hemisphere of Mars.

Being so low in elevation Lyot would have a high relative surface pressure within a restricted area. Lyot has a microenvironment (i.e. a climate in a small area that is different to that of the surroundings). Consequently, stable liquid surface water (i.e. surface pressure and temperature are above the triple point of water; see Section 3) may occur during its lifetime.

To the south are the Deuteronilus Mensae, and further to the southeast are Protonilus Mensae. To the west is the smaller Micoud crater, and to the east-southeast is Moreux crater.

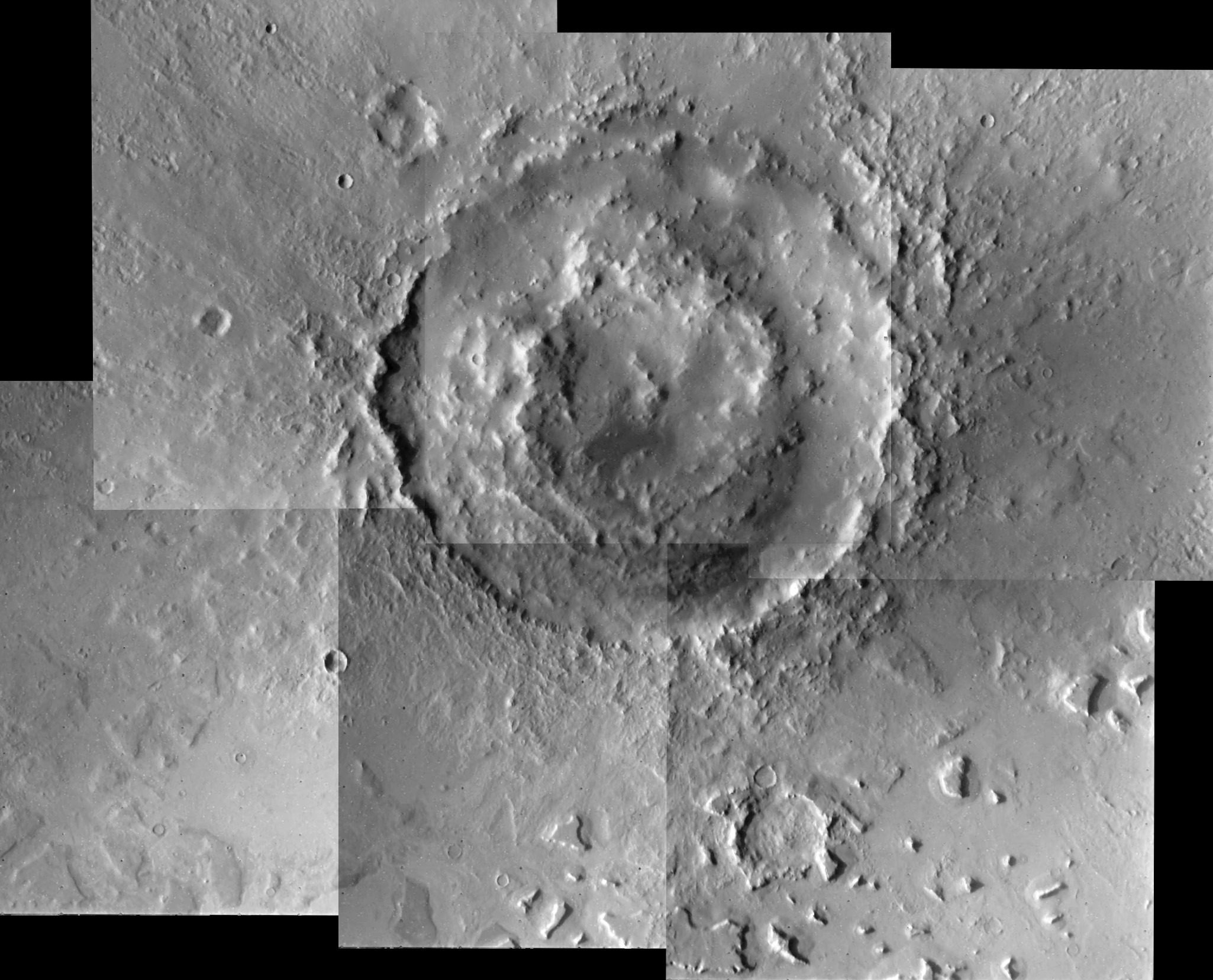
Viking Orbiter 2 mosaic

Research published in 2009 describes evidence for liquid water in Lyot in the past.

Many channels have been found near Lyot Crater. Research, published in 2017, concluded that the channels were made from water released when the hot ejecta landed on a layer of ice that was 20 to 300 meters thick. Calculations suggest that the ejecta would have had a temperature of at least 250 °F (121 °C). The valleys seem to start from beneath the ejecta near the outer edge of the ejecta. One evidence for this idea is that there are few secondary craters nearby. Few secondary craters were formed because most landed on ice and did not affect the ground below. The ice accumulated in the area when the climate was different. The tilt or obliquity of the axis changes frequently. During periods of greater tilt, ice from the poles is redistributed to the mid-latitudes. The existence of these channels is unusual because although Mars used to have water in rivers, lakes, and an ocean, these features have been dated to the Noachian and Hesperian periods—4 to 3 billion years ago.

Modelling supports the idea that Lyot went through a great deal of fluvial activity However, it would not have all happened at the same time. Water erosion took place at different times in different parts of the crater. During periods when water was not stable, it would have boiled or frozen. But although if the water was deep enough, a layer of ice on the surface of the water could have protected the liquid water underneath. Water would then flow again when conditions were suitable.

== Former rivers ==
Images from Mars Reconnaissance Orbiter show valleys carved by rivers on the floor of Lyot crater. Scientists are excited because the rivers seem to have formed more recently than others on Mars; water could have flowed in them only 1.25 million years ago. The source of the water is believed to have been ice from nearby glaciers. The river valleys are over 250 metres (820 ft) wide and tens of kilometers long.

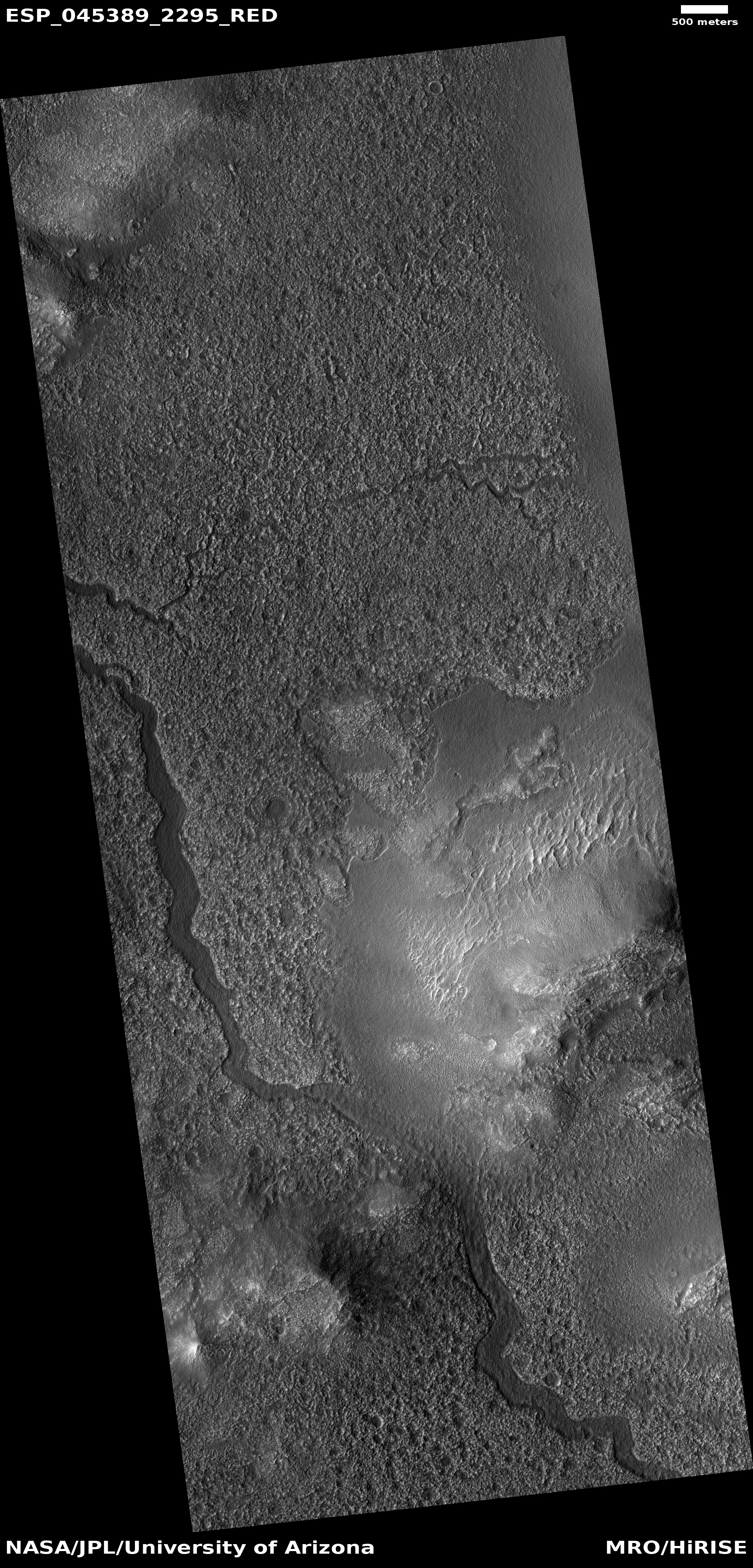
Wide view of channels in Lyot crater, as seen by HiRISE unser HiWish program

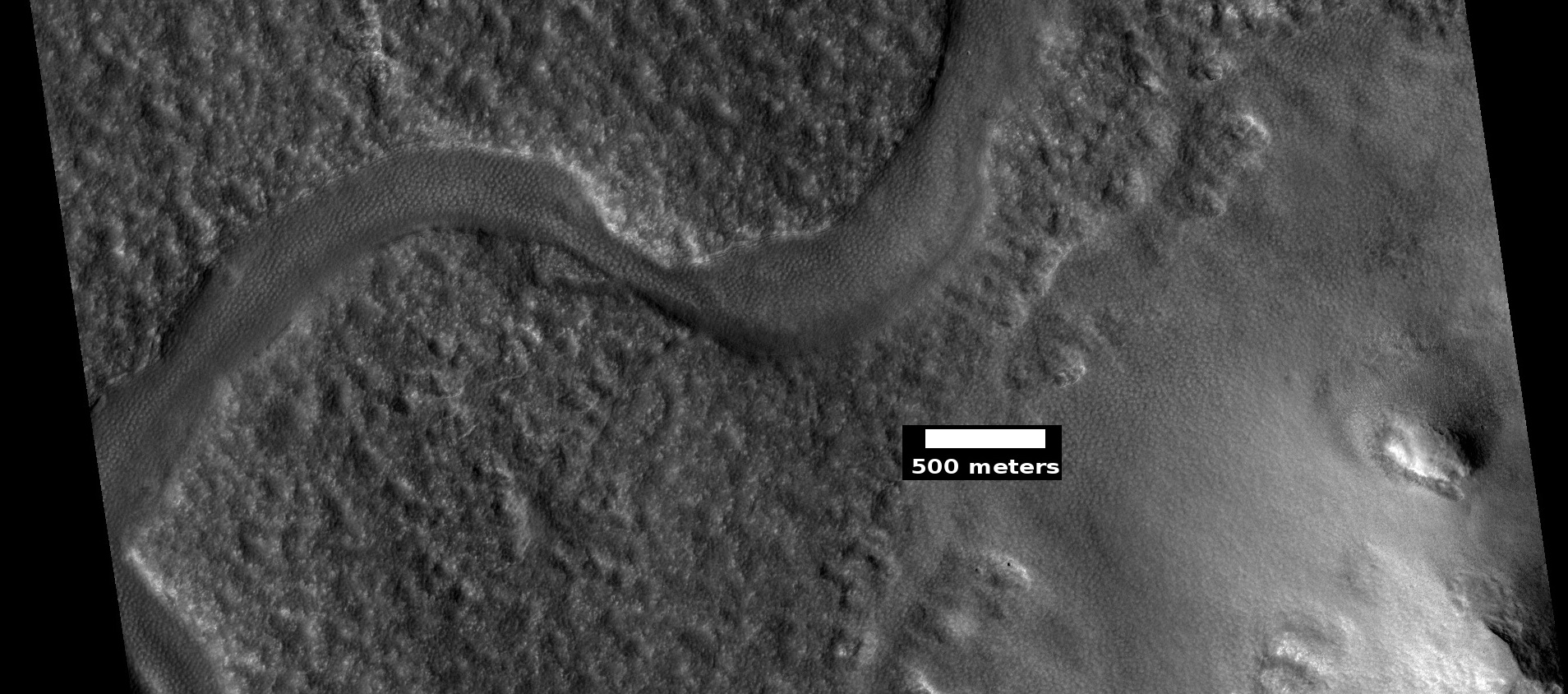
Curved channel in Lyot crater, as seen by HiRISE under HiWish program

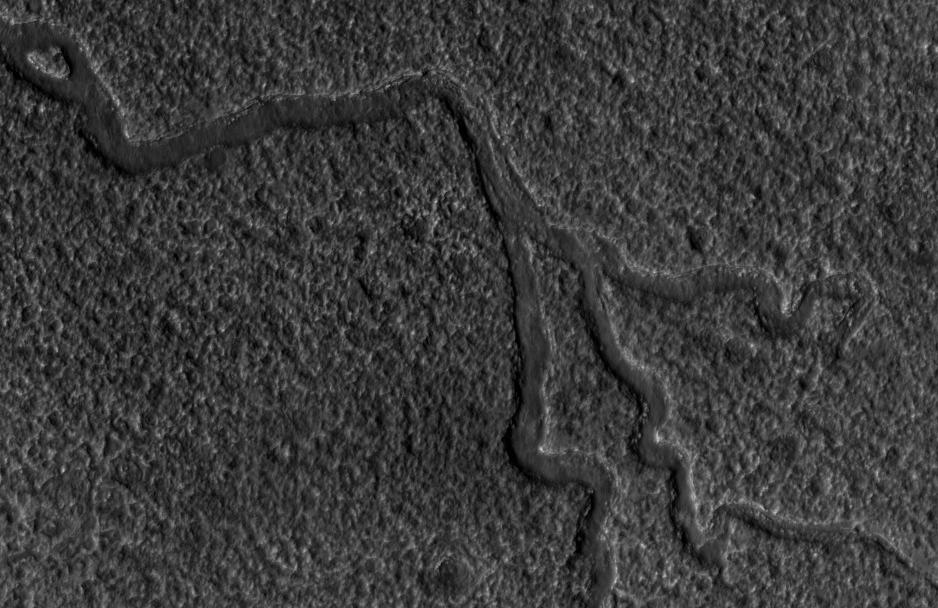
Channels in Lyot as seen by HiRISE

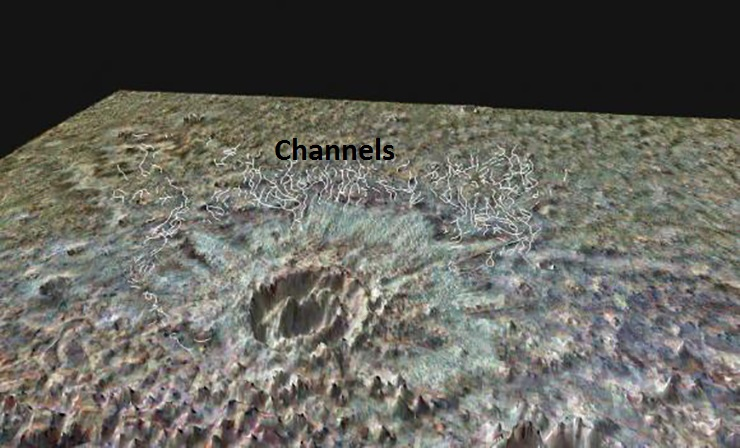
Lyot crater with elevations exaggerated showing distribution of channels caused by hot ejecta melting ice.

== Dust devil tracks ==
Many areas on Mars, including Lyot, experience the passage of giant dust devils. A thin coating of fine bright dust covers most of the Martian surface. When a dust devil goes by it blows away the coating and exposes the underlying dark surface. These dust devils have been seen from the ground and high overhead from orbit.

== More features of Lyot ==
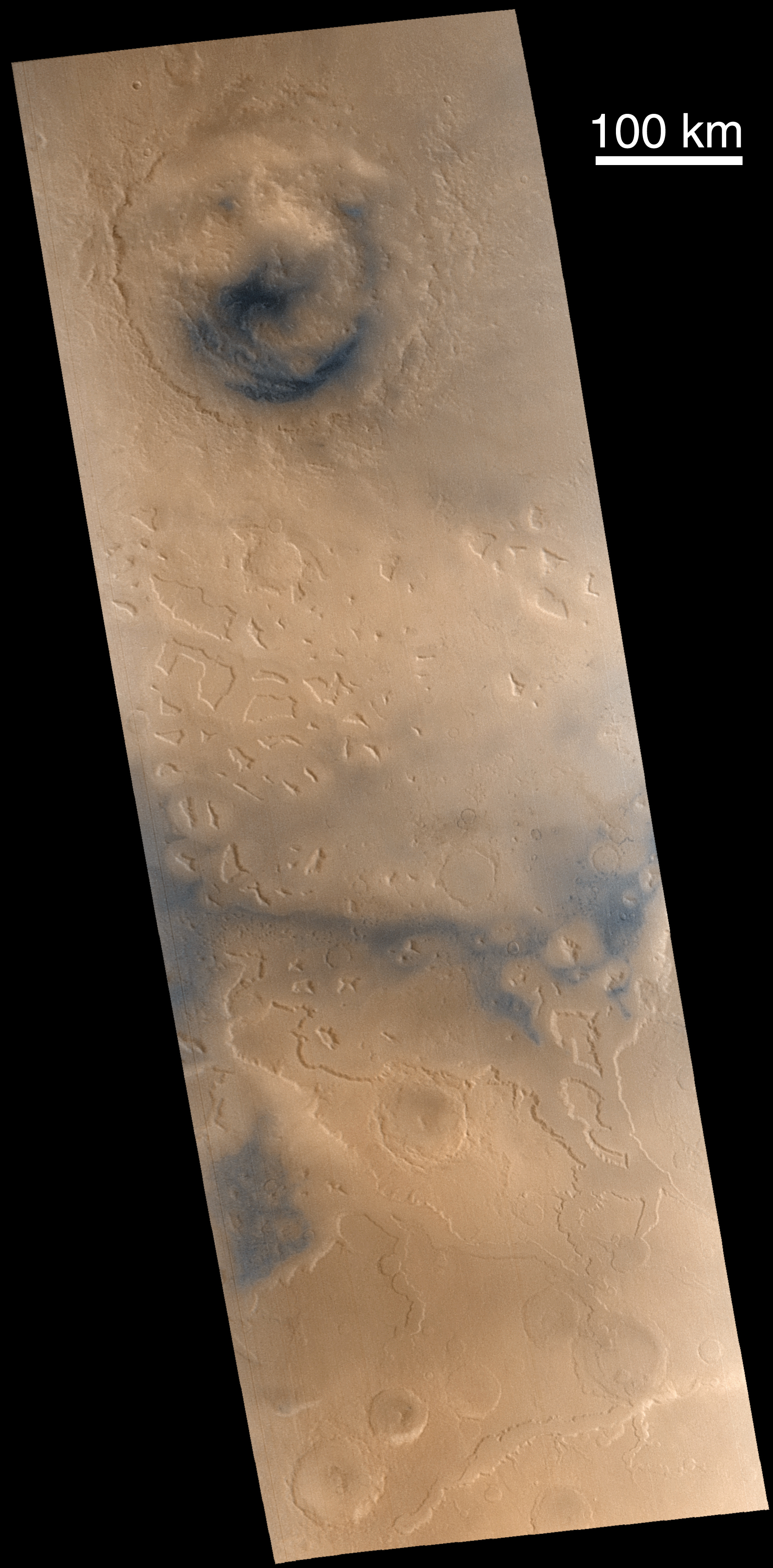
MGS image with Lyot at top

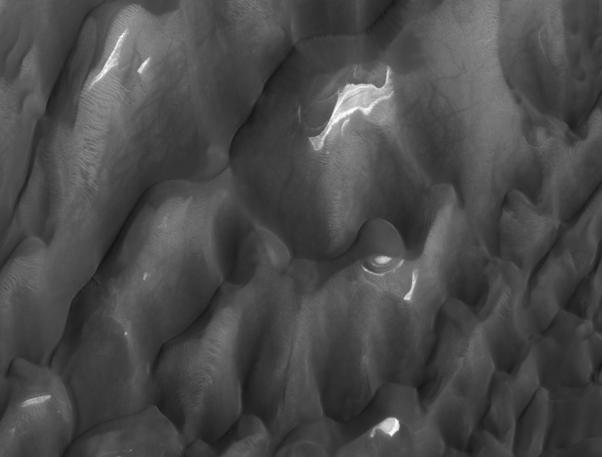
Lyot crater dunes, as seen by HiRISE. Click on image to see light toned deposits and dust devil tracks.

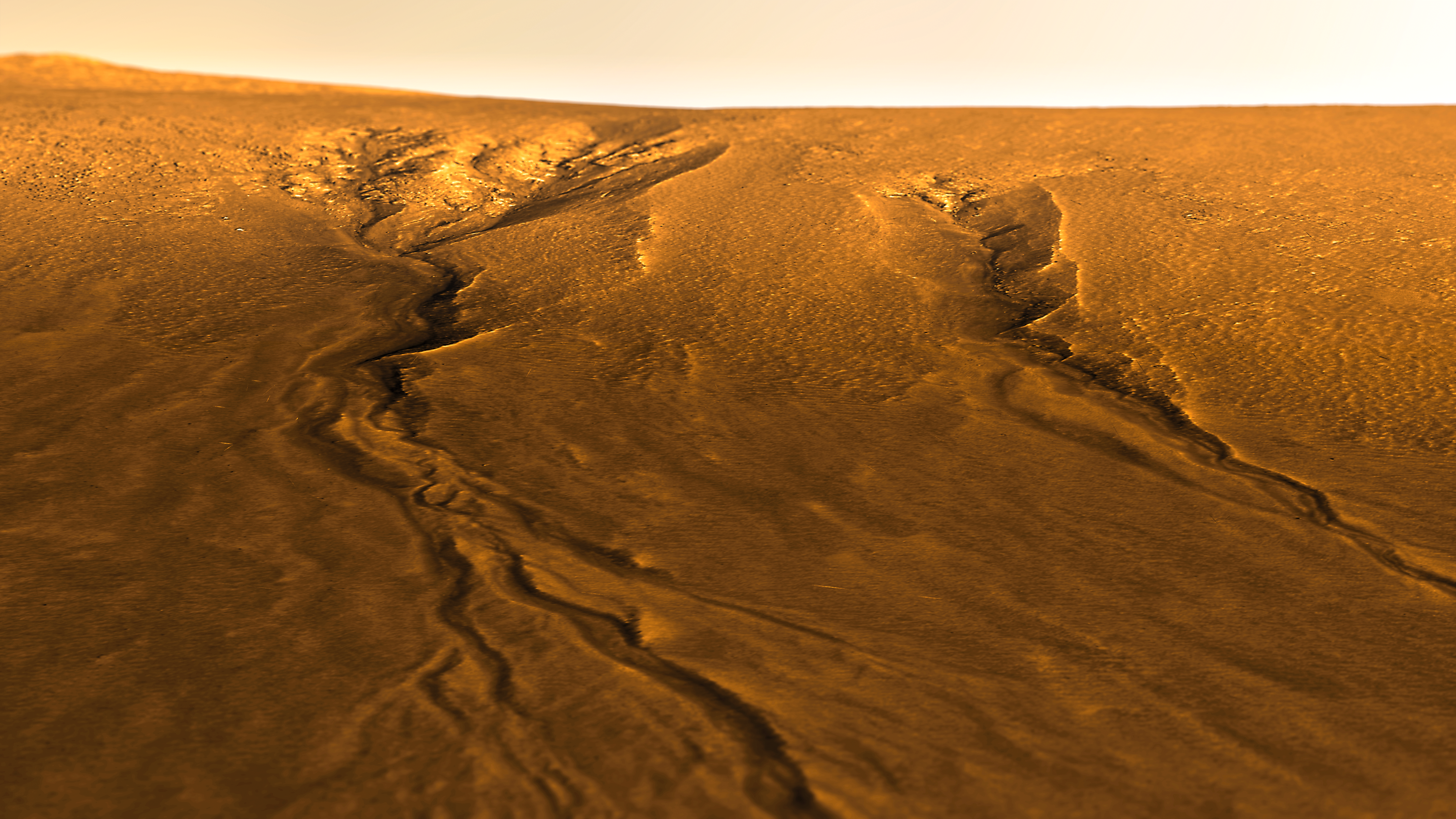
Gullies on central uplift of Lyot crater, image reprocessed from HiRISE data.

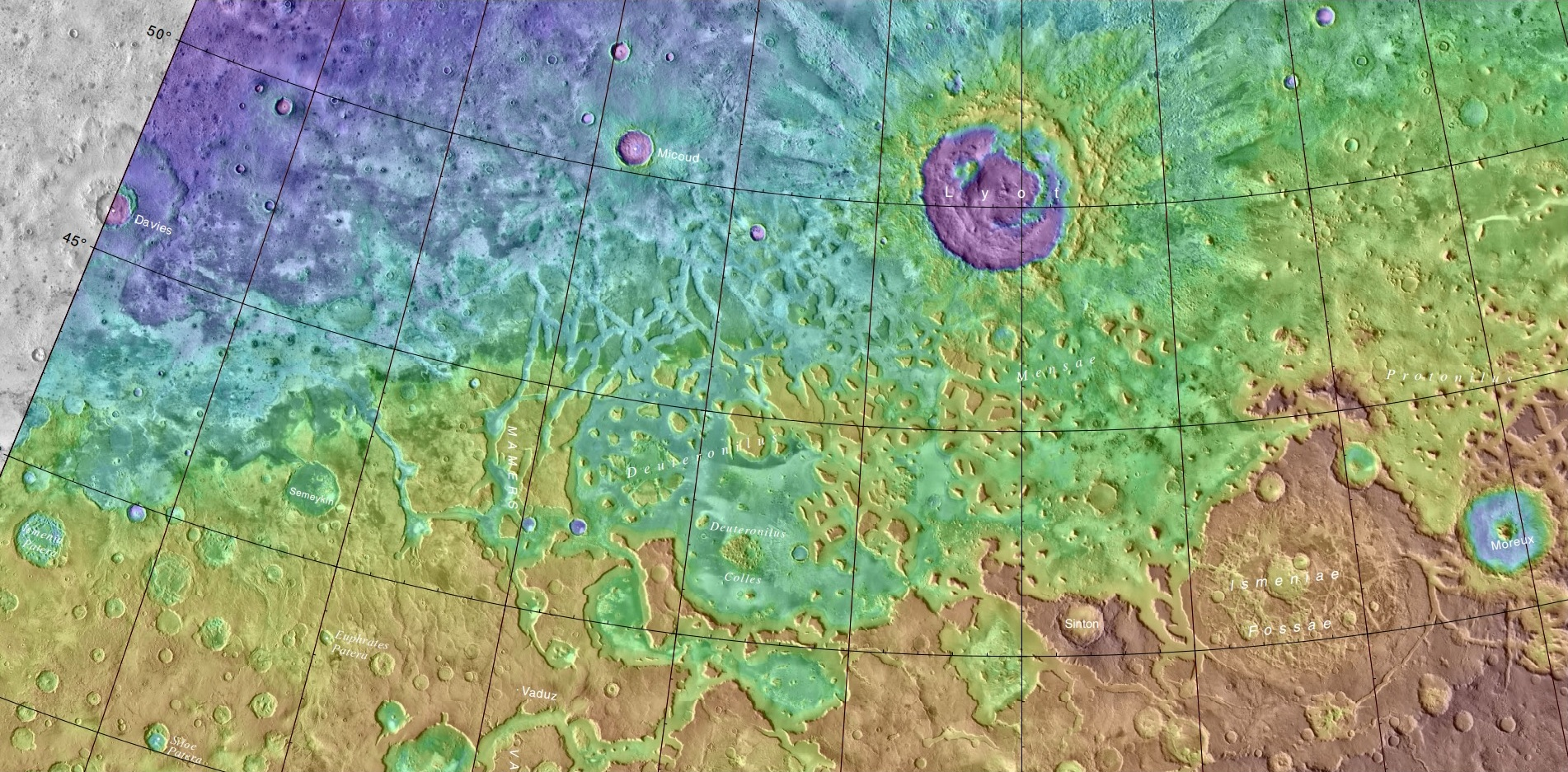
MOLA map of Lyot and other nearby craters. Colors indicate elevations.

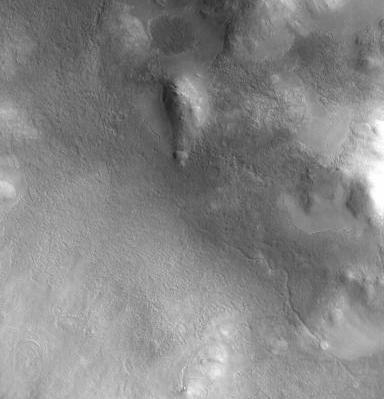
Lyot crater channel, as seen by CTX. Water-carved channels have been spotted in Lyot crater; the curved line may be one.

== See also ==
- List of craters on Mars
