= Bivariate =

Bivariate may refer to:

== Mathematics ==
- Bivariate function, a function of two variables
- Bivariate polynomial, a polynomial of two indeterminates

== Statistics ==
- Bivariate data, that shows the relationship between two variables
- Bivariate analysis, statistical analysis of two variables
- Bivariate distribution, a joint probability distribution for two variables

== Other ==
- Bivariate map, a single map that displays two variables

== See also ==
- Two-dimensional curve
- Multivariate (disambiguation)
