= Bernard Lyot =

French astronomer

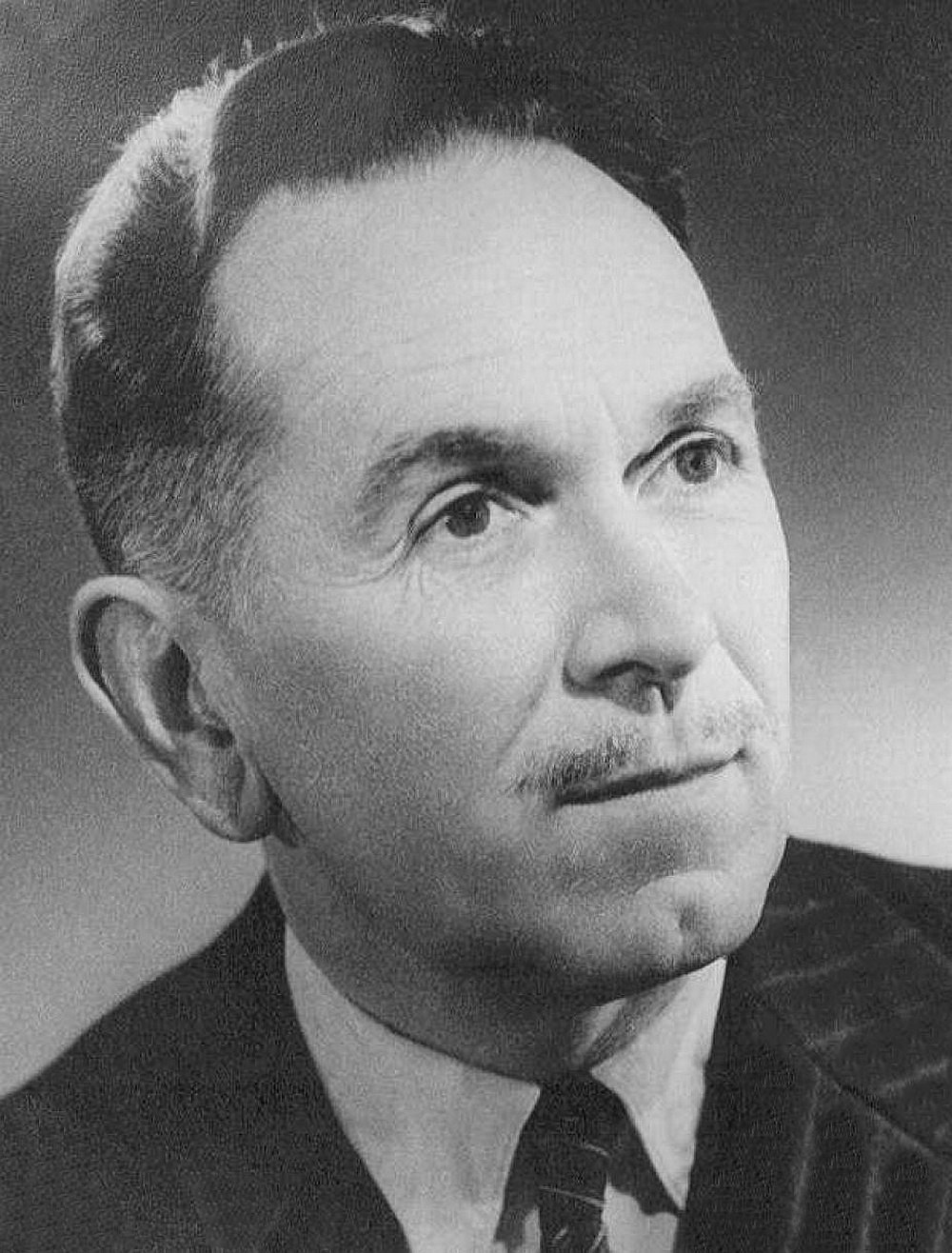
- Born: 27 February 1897; Paris, France
- Died: 2 April 1952 (aged 55); Cairo, Egypt
- Citizenship: France
- Education: University of Paris
- Known for: Solar astronomy Coronagraph; Lyot depolarizer Lyot filter Lyot stop
- Awards: Lalande Prize (1928); Prix Jules Janssen (1932); Howard N. Potts Medal (1942); Gold Medal of the Royal Astronomical Society (1939); Henry Draper Medal (1951)
- Scientific career
- Fields: Astronomy

Bernard Ferdinand Lyot (French pronunciation: [bɛʁnaʁ fɛʁdinɑ̃ ljo]; 27 February 1897 in Paris – 2 April 1952 in Cairo) was a French astronomer.

== Biography ==
An avid reader of the works of Camille Flammarion, he became a member of the Société Astronomique de France in 1915 and made his first observations using the society's telescope on rue Serpente in Paris. He soon acquired a 4-inch (100 mm) telescope and soon upgraded to a 6-inch (150 mm). From graduation in 1918 until 1929, he worked as a demonstrator at the École Polytechnique and studied engineering, physics, and chemistry at the University of Paris.

From 1920 until his death he worked for the Meudon Observatory, where in 1930 he earned the title of Joint Astronomer of the Observatory. After gaining the title, he earned a reputation of being an expert of polarized and monochromatic light. Throughout the 1930s, he labored to perfect the coronagraph, which he invented to observe the corona without having to wait for a solar eclipse. Most of this work implied painstaking long observations at the Pic du Midi Observatory. It was an exceptionally good site, free of both air pollution and light pollution but it came with a disadvantage: In the interwar period access to the peak implied mountaineering skills and physical fitness, especially in winter when access was only gained with a long and tiresome ski touring trek on sealskin-fitted skis, a technique mastered by Lyot, a keen sportsman and mountaineer. Accommodation on site can only be described as spartan, before a powerline, a bigger refuge and a cablecar were built in the early 1950s. In 1938, he showed a movie of the corona in action to the International Astronomical Union. In 1939, he was elected to the French Academy of Sciences. He became Chief Astronomer at the Meudon Observatory in 1943 and received the Bruce Medal in 1947.

Lyot was the President of the Société astronomique de France, the French astronomical society, from 1945-1947.

He suffered a heart attack while returning from an eclipse expedition in Sudan and died on 2 April 1952, at the age of 55.

== Observations and Achievements on Pic du Midi ==
- Lunar soil behaves like volcanic dust.
- Mars has sandstorms.
- Improved his coronagraph.
- Made motion pictures of solar prominences and the corona.
- Found spectral lines in the corona.

== Inventions ==
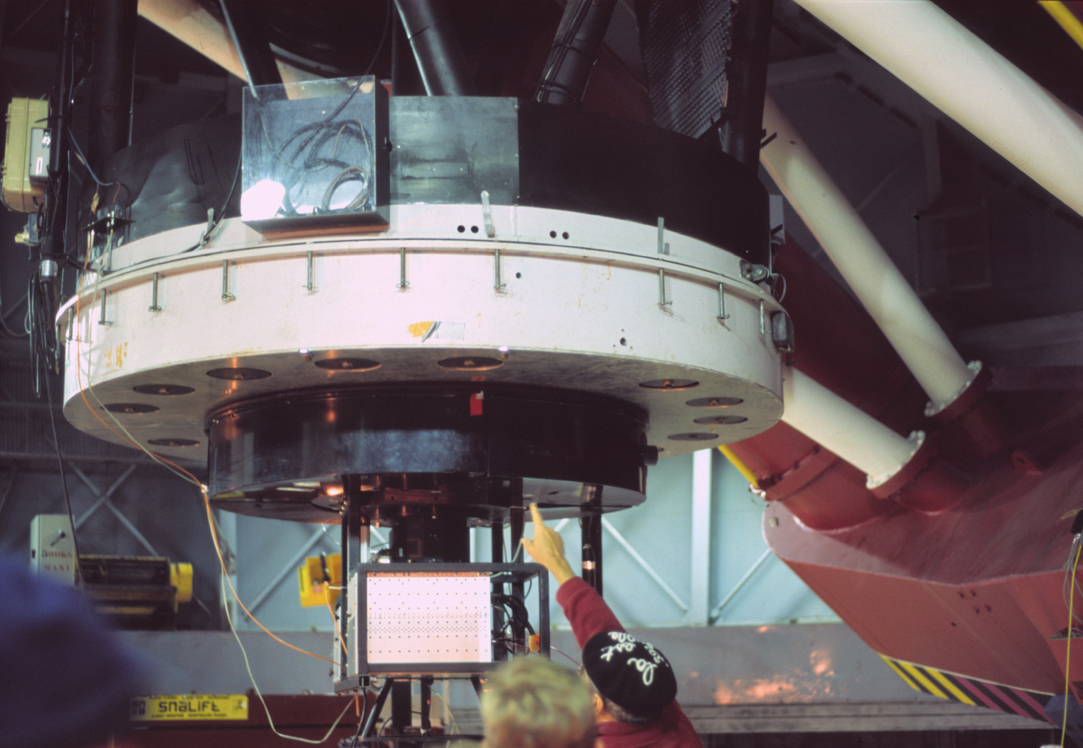
Telescope Bernard Lyot

- Coronagraph
- Lyot filter
- Lyot stop
- Lyot depolarizer

== Awards and honors ==
Awards

- Lalande Prize from the French Academy of Sciences
- Janssen Medal from the French Academy of Sciences (1930)
- Prix Jules Janssen, the highest award of the Société astronomique de France(1932)
- Gold Medal of the Royal Astronomical Society (1939)
- Howard N. Potts Medal (1942)
- Bruce Medal (1947)
- Henry Draper Medal of the National Academy of Sciences (1951)

Named for him

- Lyot (lunar crater).
- Lyot (Martian crater).
- Minor planet 2452 Lyot.
