= Multivariate optical computing =

Compressed sensing spectroscopic technique

Multivariate optical computing, also known as molecular factor computing, is an approach to the development of compressed sensing spectroscopic instruments, particularly for industrial applications such as process analytical support. "Conventional" spectroscopic methods often employ multivariate and chemometric methods, such as multivariate calibration, pattern recognition, and classification, to extract analytical information (including concentration) from data collected at many different wavelengths. Multivariate optical computing uses an optical computer to analyze the data as it is collected. The goal of this approach is to produce instruments which are simple and rugged, yet retain the benefits of multivariate techniques for the accuracy and precision of the result.

An instrument which implements this approach may be described as a multivariate optical computer. Since it describes an approach, rather than any specific wavelength range, multivariate optical computers may be built using a variety of different instruments (including Fourier Transform Infrared (FTIR) and Raman).

The "software" in multivariate optical computing is encoded directly into an optical element spectral calculation engine such as an interference filter based multivariate optical element (MOE), holographic grating, liquid crystal tunable filter, spatial light modulator (SLM), or digital micromirror device (DMD) and is specific to the particular application. The optical pattern for the spectral calculation engine is designed for the specific purpose of measuring the magnitude of that multi-wavelength pattern in the spectrum of a sample, without actually measuring a spectrum.

Multivariate optical computing allows instruments to be made with the mathematics of pattern recognition designed directly into an optical computer, which extracts information from light without recording a spectrum. This makes it possible to achieve the speed, dependability, and ruggedness necessary for real time, in-line process control instruments.

Multivariate optical computing encodes an analog optical regression vector of a transmission function for an optical element. Light which emanates from a sample contains the spectral information of that sample, whether the spectrum is discovered or not. As light passes from a sample through the element, the normalized intensity, which is detected by a broad band detector, is proportional to the dot product of the regression vector with that spectrum, i.e. is proportional to the concentration of the analyte for which the regression vector was designed. The quality of the analysis is then equal to the quality of the regression vector which is encoded. If the resolution of the regression vector is encoded to the resolution of the laboratory instrument from which that regression vector was designed and the resolution of the detector is equivalent, then the measurement made by Multivariate Optical Computing will be equivalent to that laboratory instrument by conventional means. The technique is making headway in a niche market for harsh environment detection. Specifically the technique has been adopted for use in the oil industry for detection of hydrocarbon composition in oil wells and pipeline monitoring. In such situations, laboratory quality measurements are necessary, but in harsh environments.

== History ==
Although the concept of using a single optical element for analyte regression and detection was suggested in 1986, the first full MOC concept device was published in 1997 from the Myrick group at the University of South Carolina, with a subsequent demonstration in 2001. The technique has received much recognition in the optics industry as a new method to perform optical analysis with advantages for harsh environment sensing. The technique has been applied to Raman spectroscopy, fluorescence spectroscopy, absorbance spectroscopy in the UV-Vis, NIR and MIR, microscopy, reflectance spectroscopy and hyperspectral imaging. In the years since first demonstration, applications have been demonstrated for defence, forensics, monitoring of chemical reactions, environmental monitoring, recycling, food and drug, medical and life sciences, and the petroleum industry. The first published demonstration for use of MOC in the harsh environments, was 2012 with a laboratory study with temperatures from 150F to 350F and pressures from 3000psi to 20,000psi, followed in 2013 with field trials in oil wells.
