= Lyot (lunar crater) =

Crater on the Moon

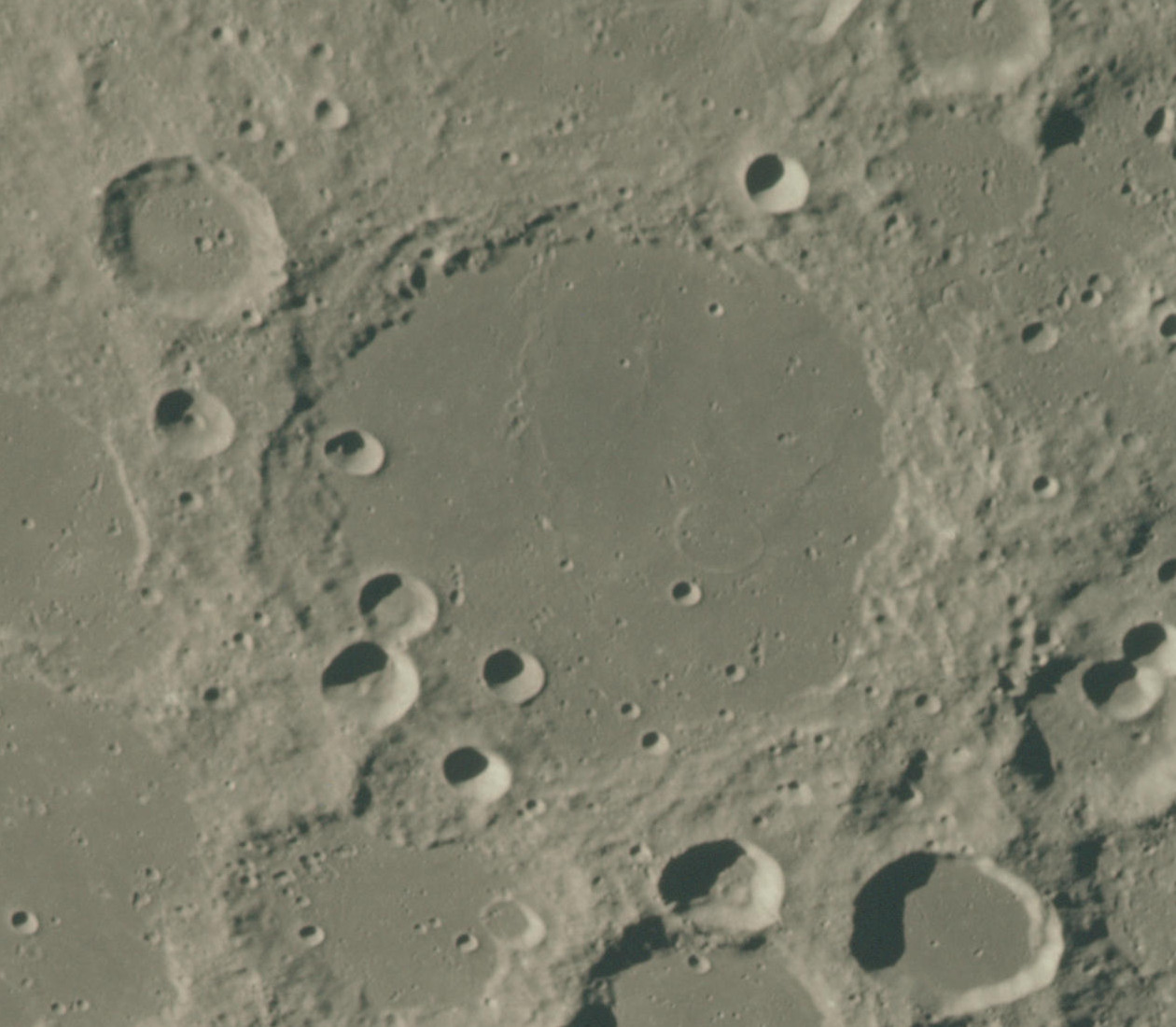
- Apollo 15 image
- Coordinates: 49.8°S 84.5°E
- Diameter: 132 km
- Depth: Unknown
- Colongitude: 279° at sunrise
- Formation: Pre-Nectarian
- Eponym: Bernard F. Lyot

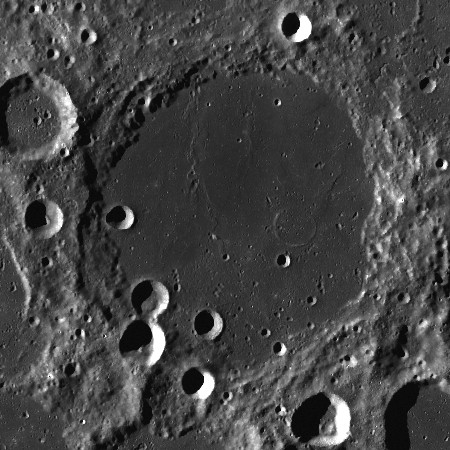
LRO mosaic

Lyot is a large lunar impact crater that is located along the southeastern limb of the Moon. It lies within the irregular and patchy lunar mare named Mare Australe, and to the south of the crater Hamilton. Due to its location, this formation is viewed at a low angle from the Earth, and its visibility is affected by libration.

The interior floor of this crater has been resurfaced by lava, leaving a dark interior with an albedo that matches the surrounding mare. The outer rim is low and heavily worn, with a perimeter that forms a somewhat distorted circle. The southwest part of the floor and rim is marked by several small, bowl-shaped craters. There is also the remains of a ghost crater to the east of the crater midpoint.

This crater is named after French astronomer Bernard F. Lyot (1897–1952).

== Satellite craters ==
By convention these features are identified on lunar maps by placing the letter on the side of the crater midpoint that is closest to Lyot.

Lyot	Latitude	Longitude	Diameter
A	49.0° S	79.6° E	38 km
B	50.4° S	82.2° E	9 km
C	50.4° S	80.4° E	17 km
D	51.6° S	82.2° E	14 km
E	52.0° S	82.9° E	13 km
F	52.3° S	82.8° E	21 km
H	51.4° S	78.2° E	63 km
L	54.4° S	83.1° E	70 km
M	53.3° S	86.2° E	24 km
N	52.8° S	83.4° E	12 km
P	47.7° S	85.0° E	13 km
R	46.1° S	87.6° E	30 km
S	46.0° S	85.6° E	26 km
T	46.8° S	78.6° E	8 km
