= WAY-100635 =

Chemical compound

Clinical data
- Other names: WAY100635; WAY-100,635
- Drug class: Serotonin 5-HT_{1A} receptor antagonist; Dopamine D_{4} receptor agonist

Identifiers
- IUPAC name: N-[2-[4-(2-Methoxyphenyl)-1-piperazinyl]ethyl]-N-(2-pyridyl)cyclohexanecarboxamide
- CAS Number: 146714-97-8
- PubChem CID: 5684
- IUPHAR/BPS: 80
- ChemSpider: 5482
- UNII: 8S48P899NE
- ChEMBL: ChEMBL31354
- CompTox Dashboard (EPA): DTXSID20167467

Chemical and physical data
- Formula: C_{25}H_{34}N_{4}O_{2}
- Molar mass: 422.573 g·mol^{−1}
- 3D model (JSmol): Interactive image
- SMILES: COC1=CC=CC=C1N2CCN(CC2)CCN(C3=CC=CC=N3)C(=O)C4CCCCC4
- InChI: InChI=1S/C25H34N4O2/c1-31-23-12-6-5-11-22(23)28-18-15-27(16-19-28)17-20-29(24-13-7-8-14-26-24)25(30)21-9-3-2-4-10-21/h5-8,11-14,21H,2-4,9-10,15-20H2,1H3; Key:SBPRIAGPYFYCRT-UHFFFAOYSA-N

WAY-100635 is a piperazine drug and research chemical widely used in scientific studies. It was originally believed to act as a selective 5-HT_{1A} receptor antagonist, but subsequent research showed that it also acts as potent full agonist at the D_{4} receptor. It is sometimes referred to as a silent antagonist at the former receptor. It is closely related to WAY-100135.

In light of its dopaminergic activity, conclusions drawn from studies that employ WAY-100635 as a selective 5-HT_{1A} antagonist may need to be re-evaluated.

== Human PET studies ==
In human PET studies WAY-100635 shows high binding in the cerebral cortex, hippocampus, raphe nucleus and amygdaloid nucleus, while lower in thalamus and basal ganglia. One study described a single case with relatively high binding in the cerebellum.

In relating its binding to subject variables one Swedish study found WAY-100635 binding in raphe brain region correlating with self-transcendence and spiritual acceptance personality traits. WAY-100635 binding has also been assessed in connection with clinical depression, where there has been disagreement about the presence and direction of the 5-HT_{1A} receptor binding. In healthy subjects WAY-100635 binding has been found to decline with age, — though not all studies have found this relationship.

Human WAY-100635 binding neuroimaging studies (patients compared to healthy control subjects).
What	Result	Subjects	Ref.
Age	Global decrease and particularly in parietal cortex and dorsolateral prefrontal cortex	19	
Age	No correlation found	61	
Age	No correlation detected	25	
Sex	Higher binding in females	25	
TCI self-transcendence and spiritual acceptance personality traits	Positive correlation in raphe region	15 males	
Lifetime aggression	Negative correlation	25	
MADAM binding potential (serotonin transporter binding)	Positive correlation in the raphe nuclei and hippocampus	12 males	
Genetic variation	Result	Subjects	Ref.
HTR1A.(-1018)C>G polymorphism	No difference found	35	
SERT.5-HTTLPR polymorphism	Lower binding in "all brain regions" for SS or SL genotypes compared to LL	35	
Disease	Result	Subjects	Ref.
Depressive (with primary, recurrent, familial mood disorders)	Reduction in raphe nucleus and mesiotemporal cortex	12+8	
Major depressive disorder (medicated and unmedicated)	Reduction in "many of the regions examined"	25+18	
Panic disorder in treated and untreated patients	Reducing in binding in raphe in both treated and untreated. Reduced binding in global postsynaptic regions for untreated, while no or little reduction for treated.	9+7+19	
Alzheimer's disease	Decrease in right medial temporal cortex	10+10	

=== Radioligands ===
Labeled with the radioisotope carbon-11 it is used as a radioligand in positron emission tomography (PET) studies to determine neuroreceptor binding in the brain. WAY-100635 may be labeled in different ways with carbon-11: As [carbonyl-^{11}C]WAY-100635 or [O-methyl-^{11}C]WAY-100635, with [carbonyl-^{11}C]WAY-100635 regarded as "far superior". Labeled with tritium WAY-100635 may also be used in autoradiography. WAY-100635 has higher 5-HT_{1A} affinity than 8-OH-DPAT.

== Other actions ==
WAY-100635 has also been found to increase the analgesic effects of opioid drugs in a dose-dependent manner, in contrast to 5-HT_{1A} agonists such as 8-OH-DPAT which were found to reduce opioid analgesia. However, since 5-HT_{1A} agonists were also found to reduce opioid-induced respiratory depression and WAY-100635 was found to block this effect, it is likely that 5-HT_{1A} antagonists might worsen this side effect of opioids. Paradoxically, chronic administration of the very high efficacy 5-HT_{1A} agonist befiradol results in potent analgesia following an initial period of hyperalgesia, an effect most likely linked to desensitisation and/or downregulation of 5-HT_{1A} receptors (i.e. analogous to a 5-HT_{1A} antagonist-like effect). As with other 5-HT_{1A} silent antagonists such as UH-301, WAY-100635 can also induce a head-twitch response in rodents.

== See also ==
- Binding potential
- Other radioligands for the serotonin system:
  - Altanserin
  - DASB
  - Mefway
