= Albert Gjedde =

Danish-Canadian Neuroscientist

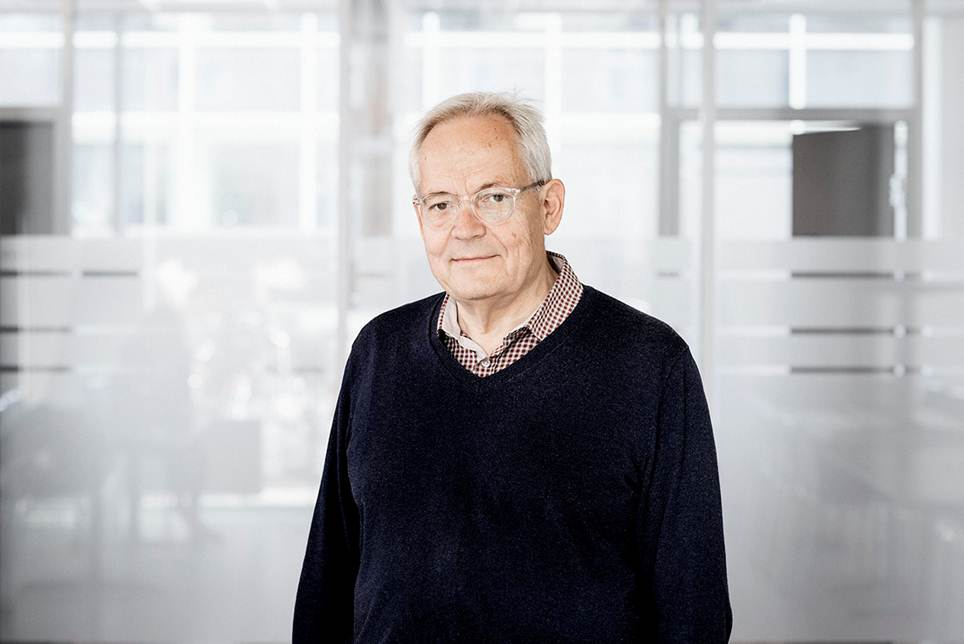
- Professor Albert Gjedde
- Born: 10 January 1946; Gentofte, Denmark
- Education: Cand.Med. ("M.D.") University of Copenhagen (1973) ECFMG examination, Educational Council, Foreign Medical Graduates, US, (1973) Dr.Med., Medical Physiology ("D.Sc.") University of Copenhagen (1983)
- Known for: Neuroenergetics, kinetic analysis of neurotransmission
- Medical career
- Profession: Medical doctor, neurobiologist
- Institutions: University of Copenhagen, Copenhagen, Denmark Montreal Neurological Institute, Montreal, Quebec, Canada Johns Hopkins University, Baltimore, Maryland, U.S.
- Sub-specialties: Neuroimaging neurotransmission
- Research: Brain energy metabolism, cerebral blood flow, monoaminergic neurotransmission
- Awards: Fellow, Royal Society of Canada (FRSC) Fellow, American College of Neuropsychopharmacology (FACNP); Member, Academia Europaea (Academy of Europe) (MAE); Erhoff Prize, Denmark Member, Norwegian Academy of Science and Letters, Norway
- Website: University of Copenhagen DNP Albert Gjedde http://dnp.ku.dk/

Albert Gjedde is a Danish-Canadian neuroscientist. He is Professor of Neurobiology and Pharmacology at the Faculty of Health Sciences and Center of Neuroscience at the University of Copenhagen. He is currently also Adjunct Professor of Neurology and Neurosurgery in the Department of Neurology, Montreal Neurological Institute, McGill University, Montreal, Quebec, Canada, Adjunct Professor of Radiology and Radiological Science in the Division of Nuclear Medicine, Department of Radiology and Radiological Science, Johns Hopkins University, Baltimore, Maryland, US, Adjunct Professor of Translational Neuropsychiatry Research, University of Southern Denmark, Odense, Denmark, and adjunct professor of psychiatry at Tabriz University of Medical Sciences, Tabriz, East Azerbadjan, Iran.

Born in the Copenhagen suburb of Gentofte in 1946, Albert Gjedde spent time as an undergraduate student in Berkeley, California, United States (1964–65, 1968), Stellenbosch, Cape Province, South Africa (1968), and Lexington, Kentucky, US (1969).

Albert Gjedde received his Medical Doctor (M.D). and Doctor of Science (D.Sc.) degrees from Copenhagen University in 1973 and 1983, respectively. He did postdoctoral work in the Neurology Department of the New York Hospital-Cornell Medical Center 1973-76 and held assistant and associate professorships in Medical Physiology at the University of Copenhagen 1976–1986.

As a junior investigator, Albert Gjedde worked as a visiting scientist at universities or research institutions in Lund, Sweden; Cologne, Leipzig, and Dresden, Germany; Paris, France; Szeged, Hungary; and Baltimore, Maryland, United States. In 1986 he joined the McConnell Brain Imaging Center at McGill University in Montreal where he held the post of Director between 1989 and 1994.

As founder, Albert Gjedde headed the Positron Emission Tomography (PET) Center at Aarhus University Hospital in Denmark during the years 1994 to 2008, and in this period he also founded the Center of Functionally Integrative Neuroscience (CFIN) in 2001 and the Danish Neuroscience Center (DNC) in 2008, both at Aarhus University. Albert Gjedde joined the University of Copenhagen in 2008. He is Fellow of the Royal Society of Canada, the American Association for the Advancement of Science, and the American College of Neuropsychopharmacology. He is also Member of the Academy of Europe, the Daylight Academy, and the Norwegian Academy of Science and Letters.

== Career ==
=== Research ===
Albert Gjedde's research focuses on the relations between neuroplasticity and neurotransmission that can be revealed by mapping radioligand binding and the neuroplastic changes of brain functions. The investigations explore the relation between energy metabolism and neurotransmission by recording the changes of energy metabolism and consciousness under pharmacological and other manipulations. He uses PET to understand the synthesis of radioligand and tracer molecules that match the neurotransmitter molecules and the behavior of these transmitters under different functional conditions of the brain, normal as well as pathological, and the spatial and temporal relations among changes of cerebral blood flow, which is commonly used as a measure of brain work, and the cerebral oxygen consumption rate, which is the precise measure of this work. Albert Gjedde's collaborations focus on experiments with volunteer subjects and patients that explore the lesions and degeneration of brain tissue in disorders such as epilepsy, ludomania, Parkinson's disease, stroke, depression, and somatizing disorders, as well as disorders related to addiction. Experiments explore the restructuring of neuronal networks that follows when sensory activity is processed by healthy subjects or volunteers suffering from inborn or acquired lesions.

In 1977, with Clifford Patlak, Albert Gjedde described the Gjedde-Patlak plot, also known as Multitime Graphical Analysis (MTGA). The MTGA linearizes irreversible brain uptake of tracers in a manner that enables regression estimates to be made of uptake rates.

=== Current academic appointments ===
- Professor of Neurobiology and Pharmacology, Faculty of Health and Medical Sciences, University of Copenhagen, Copenhagen, Denmark, since 2008
- Adjunct Professor, Department of Neurology and Neurosurgery, McGill University, Montreal, Quebec, Canada, since 1994
- Adjunct Professor of Radiology and Radiological Science, Johns Hopkins University, Baltimore Maryland, U.S.A., since 2006

=== Past academic appointments ===
- 1979–1981 Assistant Professor, Medical Physiology, The Panum Institute, University of Copenhagen, Copenhagen, Denmark
- 1981–1993 Associate Professor of Medical Physiology, The Panum Institute University of Copenhagen, Copenhagen, Denmark
- 1986–1987 Visiting Associate Professor, Montreal Neurological Institute, McGill University, Montréal, Quebec, Canada
- 1987–1989 Associate Professor, Department of Neurology and Neurosurgery, McGill University, Montréal, Quebec, Canada
- 1989–1994 Professor, Department of Neurology and Neurosurgery, McGill University, Montréal, Quebec, Canada
- 1989–1994 Director, McConnell Brain Imaging Center, Montreal Neurological Institute, McGill University, Montréal, Quebec, Canada
- 1993–1994 Adjunct Professor of Human Pathophysiology, Aarhus University, Aarhus, Denmark
- 1993–1999 MRC (Denmark) Professor of Brain Research, Aarhus University Hospitals, Aarhus, Denmark
- 1994–1999 Associate Professor of Human Pathophysiology, Institute of Experimental Clinical Research, University of Aarhus, Aarhus, Denmark
- 1994–2008 Director and Chief Physician, Positron Emission Tomography (PET) Center, Aarhus General Hospital, Aarhus University Hospitals, Aarhus, Denmark
- 1999–2008 Professor of Medical Neurobiology, Faculty of Health Sciences, University of Aarhus, Aarhus, Denmark
- 2001–2004 Director, Centre of Functionally Integrative Neuroscience, University of Aarhus, Aarhus, Denmark
- 2004–2005 Visiting Professor, Department of Diagnostic Radiology, Yale School of Medicine, New Haven, CT, U.S.
- 2008–2014 Adjunct Professor of Neuroscience, University of Aarhus, Denmark
- 2008–2014 Chairman, Department of Neuroscience and Pharmacology, Faculty of Health and Medical Sciences, University of Copenhagen, Copenhagen, Denmark, since 2008

=== Current academic positions ===
Albert Gjedde has through his career been taken different international academic positions in funding agencies, editorial- and advisory boards, council-, and committees and learned societies. Today he takes following positions.

==== Editorial boards ====
- Member, editorial board, Journal of Cerebral Blood Flow and Metabolism since 1984–1988, 1998–2002, 2012-
- Member, editorial board, Acta Neurologica Scandinavica, since 1998
- Member, editorial board, Journal of Neuroscience Methods, since 1990–1999, 2001-

==== Funding agency ====
- Danish National Expert and Delegate of the Horizon 2020 Programme Committee for Societal challenges (SC1), "Health, demographic change and wellbeing", EU, since 2014
- Member of the European Research Council (ERC) Evaluation Panels, Life Sciences (LS7), 2012, 2014 and (LS 5) 2014

==== Board, council, and committee ====
- Founder, International Symposia on Neuroreceptor Mapping (NRM) of the Living Human Brain, Aarhus, Denmark 1997, subsequently held 1998, and every second year thereafter
- Executive Committee Member. European Dana Alliance for the Brain, since 1997
- Member, Review Committee, International Symposium on Neuroreceptor Mapping (NRM) of Living Brain, Amsterdam, Netherlands, since 2014
- Member, board of directors, Grete Lundbeck European Brain Research Prize Foundation, Copenhagen, Denmark, since 2014 - 2015

=== Past academic positions ===
==== Editorial boards ====
- 1977–1979 Editorial Secretary, Volume VII (Medicine), Copenhagen University 1479–1979, volumes I-XIV, Treaties in Honor of the Quintcentennial Anniversary of Schola Hafniensis (Copenhagen University)
- 1986–1987 Supplement editor, Journal of Cerebral Blood Flow and Metabolism, Volume 7, Supplement 1, 1987 (XIII International Symposium on Cerebral Blood Flow and Metabolism)
- 1988–1992 Deputy chief editor, Journal of Cerebral Blood Flow and Metabolism
- 1988–2004 Associate editor, International Journal of Neural Systems.
- 1997 Proceedings editor, NeuroImage, Supplement 1997 (III International Symposium on Mapping of the Human Brain, Copenhagen).
- 1998–2011 Member, editorial board, NeuroImage
- 2003- Member, editorial board, Current Medical Imaging Reviews CMIR

==== Funding agency ====
- 1991–1994 Member, Neurosciences A Committee, Medical Research Council of Canada now Canadian Institutes of Health Research (CIHR)
- 1992–1994 Special Member, Neurology A Study Group, National Institute of Neurological Diseases and Stroke, National Institutes of Health, USA
- 1999–2005 Chairman, Research Funding Committee, Multiple Sclerosis Society of Denmark
- 2005–2010 Member, Medical Research Council, Denmark
- 2006–2010 Official Delegate, European Medical Research Councils, European Science Foundation, Strasbourg, European Union
- 2007–2010 Official Delegate Nordic Medical Research Councils, Nordic Council
- 2007–2013 National Expert, PC Health, The Framework Programmes for Research and Technological Development (FP7)
- 2013- National Expert, SCI Health, Horizon 2020

==== Board, council, and committee ====
- 1975–1978 Director/Trustee, American Field Service, Inc., New York, U.S.A.
- 1983 Member, Scientific Advisory Board, XI International Symposium on Cerebral Blood and Metabolism, Paris, France
- 1985 Member, Scientific Advisory Board, XII International Symposium on Cerebral Blood and Metabolism, Lund-Ronneby, Sweden
- 1986–1994 Member, Commission on Bioengineering in Physiology, International Union of Physiological Societies (IUPS)
- 1987 Member, Scientific Advisory Board, XIII International Symposium on Cerebral Blood and Metabolism, Montreal, Quebec, Canada
- 1988–1994 Member, Scientific Advisory Board, Department of Nuclear Medicine, University of Michigan, Ann Arbor, Michigan, U.S.A.
- 1989–1994 Member, U.S. Department of Energy Program Grant Advisory Board, Department of Nuclear Medicine, Memorial-Sloan Kettering Cancer Center, New York, U.S.A.
- 1989–1994 Member, U.S. National Institutes of Health Program Grant Advisory Board, Division of Nuclear Medicine, Department of Radiology and Radiation Health Sciences, Johns Hopkins Hospital and Medical Institutions, Baltimore, Maryland, U.S.A
- 1989 Member, Scientific Advisory Board, XIV International Symposium on Cerebral Blood and Metabolism, Bologna, Italy
- 1991 Member, Scientific Advisory Board, XV International Symposium on Cerebral Blood and Metabolism, Miami, Florida, U.S.A.
- 1991–2006 Member, Scientific Advisory Board, Axion Research Foundation (Yale Transplant Project), Hamden, Connecticut, and Basseterre, St.Kitts, W.I.
- 1993 Member, Scientific Advisory Board, XVI International Symposium on Cerebral Blood and Metabolism, Sendai, Japan
- 1995 Member, Scientific Advisory Board, I International Symposium on Functional Mapping of the Human, Brain, Paris, France
- 1995 Member, Scientific Advisory Board, XVII International Symposium on Cerebral Blood and Metabolism, Cologne, Germany
- 1996 Member, Scientific Advisory Board, II International Symposium on Functional Mapping of the Human Brain, Boston, Massachusetts, U.S.A.
- 1996–2008 Member, board of directors, Steno Science Museum, Aarhus, Denmark
- 1997 Chairman, Organizing Committee, First International Symposium on Neuroreceptor Mapping of Living Brain, "Mapping Neuroreceptors at Work", Aarhus, Denmark
- 1997 Member, Scientific Advisory Board, III International Symposium on Functional Mapping of the Human Brain, Copenhagen, Denmark
- 1997 Member, Scientific Advisory Board, XVIII International Symposium on Cerebral Blood and Metabolism, Baltimore, Maryland, U.S.A.
- 1997–2002 Chairman, Scientific Advisory Board, PET Research Center Helmholtz-Zentrum Dresden-Rossendorf, Dresden, Germany
- 1998 Chairman, Scientific Program Committee, IV International Symposium on Functional Mapping of the Human Brain, Montreal, Canada
- 1999 Member, Scientific Advisory Board, XIV International Symposium on Cerebral Blood and Metabolism, Copenhagen, Denmark
- 1999 Chairman, Scientific Program Committee, V International Symposium on Functional Mapping of the Human Brain, Duesseldorf, Germany
- 2002–2007 Member, Scientific Advisory Board, Helsinki Brain Research Center, Academy of Finland, Helsinki, Finland
- 2003 Member, Program Committee, International Brain Research Organization IBRO World Congress, Prague, Czech Republic
- 2004–2006 Member, Scientific Advisory Board, Arvid Carlsson Institute, University of Gothenburg, Gothenburg, Sweden
- 2004–2012 Member, Danish Committees on Scientific Dishonesty (UVVU), Ministry of Science, Technology and Innovation, Denmark
- 2006–2008 vice-chair, Gordon Research Conference on Brain Energy Metabolism and Blood Flow, Proctor Academy, Andover, Maine, USA
- 2006–2009 Chair, Research Advisory Board, Royal Library, Denmark, Copenhagen, Denmark
- 2008–2010 Chairman, Gordon Research Conference on Brain Energy Metabolism and Blood Flow,
- 2008 Member, Organizing Committee, International Symposium on Neuroreceptor Mapping of Living Brain, Pittsburgh, Pennsylvania, U.S.A.
- 2008–2010 Chair, Gordon Research Conference on Brain Energy Metabolism and Blood Flow
- 2010 Member, Organizing Committee, International Symposium on Neuroreceptor Mapping of Living Brain, Glasgow, U.K.
- 2012 Member, Organizing Committee, International Symposium on Neuroreceptor Mapping of Living Brain, Baltimore, Maryland, U.S.A.

=== Past administrative positions ===
- 1989–1994 Director, McConnell Brain Imaging Center (BIC), Montreal Neurological Institute, Canada
- 1994–2008 Director, Positron Emission Tomography PET Center, Aarhus University Hospital, Aarhus, Denmark
- 2001–2004 Director, Centre of Functionally Integrative Neuroscience (CFIN), Aarhus University
- 2008–2014 Head, Department of Neuroscience and Pharmacology (INF), University of Copenhagen, Denmark. Encompasses around 335 staff members, publishes around 200 peer-reviewed papers per year and has an annual budget of roughly 120 mio. DDK or 16 mio €.
- 2008–2014 Head, Department of Neuroscience and Pharmacology (INF), University of Copenhagen, Denmark. INF encompasses around 335 staff members, publishes around 200 peer-reviewed papers per year and has an annual budget of roughly 120 mio. DDK or 160 mio €.

=== Academic distinctions ===
- 1970 Gold Medal in Medicine, University of Copenhagen, Denmark
- 1972 The American Cyanamid Corporation's Lederle Award, U.S.A.
- 1975 The Martin Salomonsen Award in Medical History, University of Copenhagen, Denmark
- 1982 The Dannin Foundation Award for Outstanding Research in Science, Denmark
- 1986 Bankier Henry Hansen's Award, University of Copenhagen, Denmark
- 1987 Anna Bochardt's Award, Society of Medicine, Copenhagen, Denmark
- 1992 Craigie Lecturer, 2nd Craigie Conference, Montreal, Canada
- 1995 Christenson-Ceson Family Foundation Award For Major Research Accomplishments, Danish Medical Association, Denmark
- 1996 Magda Agathe Strunge's Award, Aarhus University, Denmark
- 1998 Kuhl-Lassen Lecturer, Brain Imaging Council, Society of Nuclear Medicine, U.S.A.
- 1999 Fellow of the AAAS, American Association for the Advancement of Science (FAAAS), U.S.A.
- 2000 Grand Research Prize, Order of Odd Fellows, Denmark
- 2000 Carl Krebs Honorary Award, Aarhus University Hospitals, Aarhus, Denmark
- 2003 Fellow of the Royal Society of Canada (FRSC), Canada
- 2004 Roy & Sherrington Award, Gordon Research Conferences, Colby College, Maine, U.S.A.
- 2005 Fellow, American College of Neuropsychopharmacology (FACNP), U.S.A.
- 2006 Danish Orthopedic Society Honorary Lecturer, Odense, Denmark
- 2009 Member, Academia Europaea (Academy of Europe)
- 2010 Global Excellence Award, Capital Region Hospitals, Denmark
- 2010 Chancellor's Award Lecture in Neuroscience, Louisiana State University, New Orleans, Louisiana, U.S.A.
- 2010 Erhoff Prize, Denmark
- 2011 Orr E. Reynolds Award, American Physiological Society
- 2012 Research Communication Prize, The Danish Ministry of Science, Innovation and Higher Education, Denmark
- 2013 Alzheimer Foundation Research Prize, Denmark
- 2013 Niels A. Lassen Prize, Denmark
- 2014 Foreign Member, Norwegian Academy of Science and Letters, Norway

== Publication statistics ==
Publications statistics by June 3, 2015

Google scholar citations Total:

- Total 20.681
- i10 index: 271
- Hirsch index: 74

Since 2010:

- Total 6.970
- i10 index: 158
- Hirsch index: 39

== Publications ==
Albert Gjedde has peer-reviewed, authored or edited a number of publications including the following books and booklets

- Gjedde A. (1971): Peter Ludvig Panums videnskabelige indsats. Copenhagen: Særtryk af Bibliotek for læger.
- Plum F, Gjedde A, Samson F (1976) (eds.) Neuroanatomical functional mapping by the radioactive 2-deoxy-D-glucose method. Neurosciences Research Program Bulletin, Boston.
- Melchior JC, Andreasen E, Brøchner-Mortensen K, Gjedde A, Møller-Christensen V, Trolle D (1979) (eds.) Københavns Universitet 1479-1979. Bind VII. Det lægevidenskabelige Fakultet. Copenhagen: Københavns Universitet.
- Gjedde A. (1983): Modulation of substrate transport to the brain. Disputats Københavns Universitet. Copenhagen: Medical Physiology Departement A, The Panum Institute
- Hakim A, Gjedde A (1987) (eds.) Brain87: Proceedings of the Thirteenth International Symposium on Cerebral Blood Flow and Metabolism. New York: Lippincott-Raven.
- Johannsen P, Gjedde A (2000) PET-skanning og demensudredning. Copenhagen: Pfizer A/S. ID number: OCLC 463899907 or DBF 200208.
- Gjedde A, Hansen SB, Knudsen GM, Paulson OB (2000) (eds.) Physiological Imaging of the Brain with PET. San Diego: Academic Press.ID Number: ISBN 0122857518.
- Ellemann K, Gjedde A., Hall N.M, Holm K., Madsen P.L., Møller M., Pedersen P.M., Rogvi-Hansen B. á, Sørensen P. (2003): Hjernen og bevidsthed, en oversigt over aktuel viden. Copenhagen: Hjerneforum. ID number: ISBN 8798887017
- Saleemi A, Bohn OS, Gjedde A (2005) In Search of a Language for the Mind-Brain. Aarhus: Aarhus University Press. ID number: ISBN 8779340059.
- Gjedde A., Graugaard C., Kjær T.W., Kristensen E., Mosbæk-Guildal A., Møllgård K, Pakkenberg B., Rogvi-Hansen B. á, Stødkilde-Jørgensen H. (2005): Hjernen og seksualitet. Copenhagen: Hjerneforum. ISBN 8798887033
- Binzer M., Gjedde A., Hall N.M., Kyllingsbæk S., Lindhardt J., Pedersen P.M., Rogvi-Hansen B. á, Rosenberg R., (2006): Hjernen vil bedrages. Copenhagen: Hjerneforum. ID number: ISBN 8798887041
- Gjedde A, Bauer WR, Wong DF (2010) Neurokinetics: The Dynamics of Neurobiology in Vivo. Springer: New York 2010, pp. 343. ID number: ISBN 978-1-4419-7408-2 (Print) ISBN 978-1-4419-7409-9 (Online)

== See also ==
- Patlak plot
- Niels A. Lassen
- Altanserin
