= Jeff Meyer =

Jeff or Jeffrey Meyer may refer to:

- Jeff Meyer (director), American television director
- Jeff Meyer (musician) (born 1979), American bassist
- Jeff Meyer (basketball) (born 1954), assistant men's basketball coach at University of Michigan
- Jeffrey H. Meyer, Canadian scientist
- Jeffrey A. Meyer (1963–2025), United States District Judge
