= Jeffrey H. Meyer =

Canadian neuroscientist and professor

Jeffrey H. Meyer is a scientist and professor working with mood and anxiety disorders using neuroimaging at the Department of Psychiatry, University of Toronto. He is currently the head of the Neurochemical Imaging Program in Mood and Anxiety Disorders in the Brain Health Imaging Centre at the Campbell Family Mental Health Research Institute and is working as a Senior Scientist in the General and Health Systems Psychiatry Division at the Centre for Addiction and Mental Health. He has also been awarded with the Tier 1 Canada Research Chair in the Neurochemistry of Major Depression.

Meyer has experience in working with positron emission tomography, including the use of [11C]DASB, [11C]harmine, [18F]FEPPA, [18F]setoperone, [11C]raclopride, [18F]SynVesT1, and [11C]SL25.1188 radioligands to examine neuropsychiatric disorders.

== Areas of research ==
Meyer focuses on reducing the impact of clinical depression on society through his psychiatric research. Two aspects of such research are:

- Developing new strategies to overcome treatment resistant depression: For example, treatment resistance is associated with comorbidity. Meyer conducts neuroimaging studies to understand the relationship between treatment-resistant depression and common comorbid illnesses (e.g., SARS-CoV-2 infection, obsessive-compulsive disorder, borderline personality disorder, anorexia nervosa, and traumatic brain injury)
- Preventing the development of major depressive episodes: By identifying biological markers associated with the onset of the mood disorders, new approaches can be taken to increase resiliency against such changes.

In recent years, Meyer has focused on research related to neuroinflammation (e.g., markers of microglial and astroglial activation), monoamine oxidase, and synaptic density. His work primarily uses neuroimaging to study psychiatric illnesses, complemented by preclinical approaches to investigate related biomarkers. Meyer has also led early-phase trials testing novel therapeutics targeting pathological markers of depression and has explored peripheral biomarkers linked to mood disorders. Additionally, he has developed natural health products aimed at alleviating depressive symptoms, particularly during early postpartum and perimenopause.

== Scientific contributions ==
Notable discoveries that Meyer has made in the field of psychiatric research include:

- The creation of a dietary supplement aimed at enhancing resilience against elevated monoamine oxidase A levels during the early postpartum period. This supplement, formulated with natural antioxidants and monoamine precursors, is designed to prevent depressive moods associated with postpartum blues, a precursor to postpartum depression. Its efficacy is supported by findings from an open trial published in PNAS (2017) and a randomized, double-blind placebo-controlled study published in eClinical Medicine (2024). Currently, the supplement is manufactured and sold in the United States, with plans for distribution in additional countries, including Canada.
- Discovering a strong presence of neuroinflammation (i.e., gliosis) in those who are experiencing major depressive episodes and that this inflammation in the brain has the potential to worsen over a longer duration if left untreated
- Discovering evidence of elevated levels of monoamine oxidase A in those who are going through early postpartum or perimenopause, as well as those who are experiencing intense emotional states associated with a higher risk for developing major depressive episodes, including: Being unable to control the consumption of alcohol, being in the early stages of nicotine withdrawal, and having a diagnosis of borderline personality disorder
- Discovering a pattern of elevated levels of monoamine oxidase A in those who are experiencing major depressive episodes
- Discovering a pattern of elevated levels of monoamine oxidase B in those with major depressive disorder—specifically in the prefrontal regions of the brain
- Discovering a strong presence of neuroinflammation—specifically in the implicated cortico-striatal-thalamo-cortical circuit located in the brain—in adults with obsessive-compulsive disorder
- Finding evidence that shows how selective serotonin reuptake inhibitors (SSRIS; i.e., antidepressants) produce 80% occupancy for their target site
- Finding a correlation between seasonal variation and serotonin transporter binding—binding is shown to increase during the winter season, compared to the summer season
- Finding patterns of elevated serotonin 2 receptor and striatal dopamine 2 receptor binding in both the prefrontal and anterior cingulate cortex—especially in those who score higher in targeted symptom clusters—in those with major depressive disorder who have remained medication-free for an extended period, and that serotonin 2 receptor binding decreases in those who take antidepressants that raise serotonin levels—this implies that it may be more effective to administer therapeutics that target specific subtypes of serotonin 2 receptors (e.g., psilocybin) prior to taking antidepressants that raise serotonin levels

== Awards ==
Meyer has received many awards for his contributions to psychiatric research, including the following:

- The AE Bennett Award from the Society of Biological Psychiatry
- The Distinguished Investigator Award from the Brain and Behavior Research Foundation
- The Innovations in Psychiatry and Young Investigator Awards from the Canadian College of Neuropsychopharmacology
- The Samarthji Lal Award from the Graham Boeckh Foundation
- The John Dewan Prize from the Ontario Mental Health Foundation
- The Royal College Medal Award in Medicine, for outstanding contributions to psychiatric research
- The Canada Research Chair in Neurochemistry of Major Depression (Tier 1), renewed in 2022 by the Canadian Institutes of Health Research.
- The CCNP Innovations Award from the Canadian College of Neuropsychopharmacology (2020).
