= Kinetic exclusion assay =

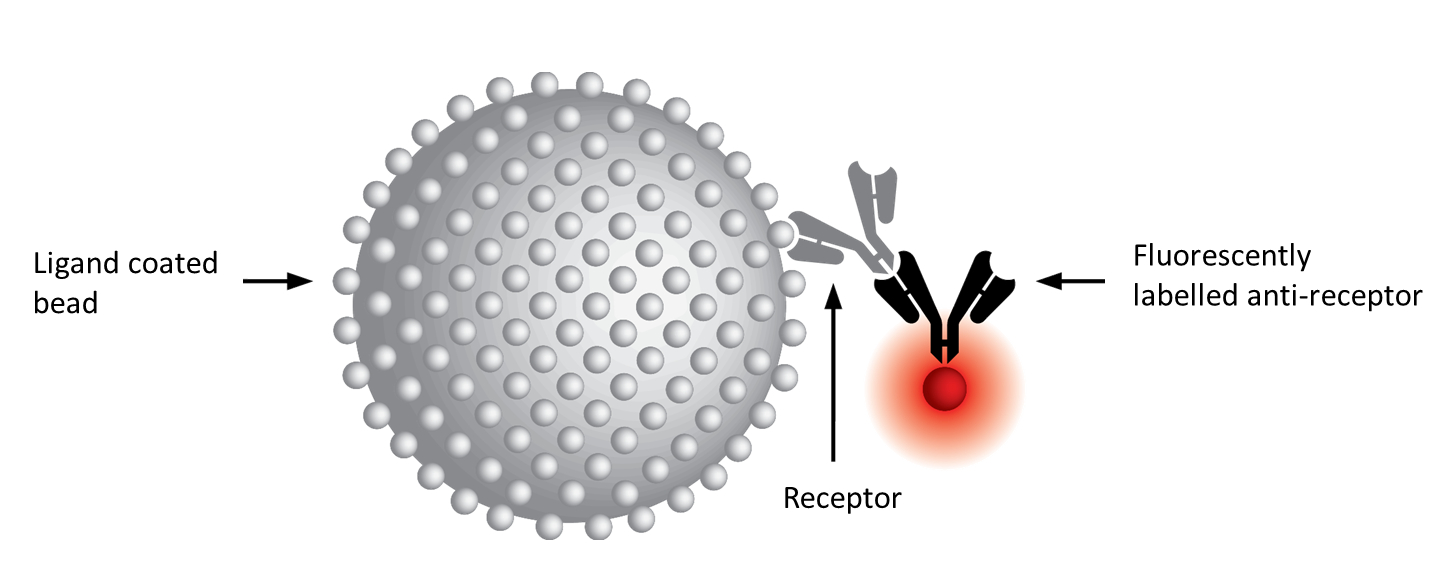
Figure 1. A fraction of receptor not bound to ligand in solution is captured by the ligand coated solid phase and subsequently labelled with a fluorescent secondary antibody.

A kinetic exclusion assay (KinExA) is a type of bioassay in which a solution containing receptor, ligand, and receptor-ligand complex is briefly exposed to additional ligand immobilized on a solid phase.

== Description ==
During the assay, a fraction of the free receptor is captured by the solid phase ligand and subsequently labeled with a fluorescent secondary molecule (Figure 1). The short contact time with the solid phase does not allow significant dissociation of the pre-formed complexes in the solution. Solution dissociation is thus "kinetically excluded" from contributing to the captured receptor and the resulting signal provides a measure of the free receptor in the solution.

Measuring the free receptor as a function of total ligand in a series of equilibrated solutions enables calculation of the equilibrium dissociation constant (K_{d}). Measuring the free receptor with several points before equilibrium enables measurement of the association rate constant (k_{on}). The off rate (k_{off}) can also be directly measured, however it is usually calculated from the measured K_{d} and measured k_{on}, (k_{off} = K_{d} * k_{on}).

Kinetic exclusion assays have been used to measure K_{d}'s in the nanomolar to femtomolar range.

== Applications ==
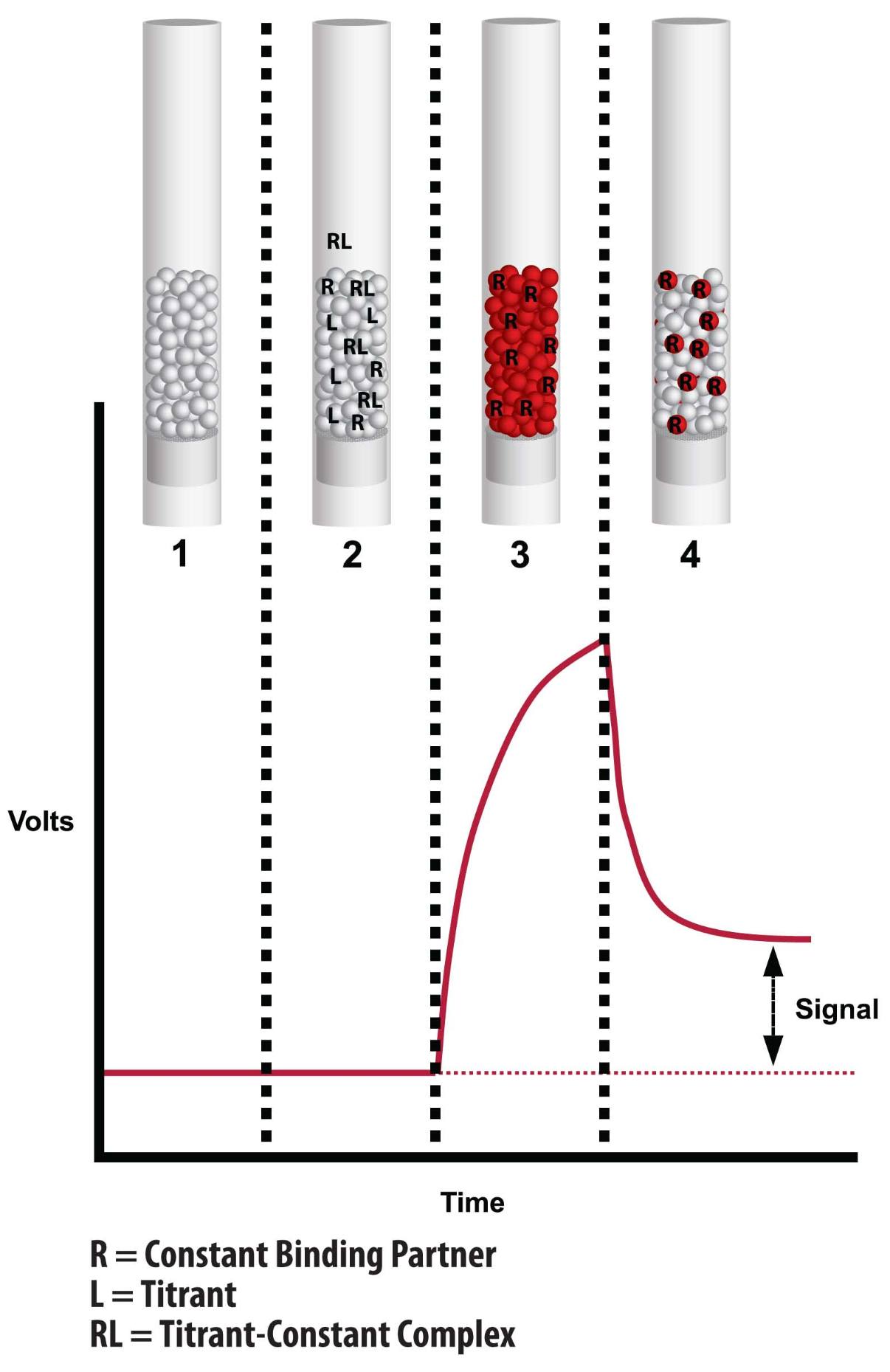
Figure 2. Example of signal generation. 1) Beads Load. 2) Equilibrated solution passes over column. 3) Introduction of secondary label. 4) Fluorescent emission of captured free receptor.

Because the fluorescent secondary molecule is applied after capture of the free receptor from solution (Figure 2) the binding constants measured using a kinetic exclusion assay are for unmodified molecules in solution and thus more accurately reflects endogenous binding interactions than methods requiring modification (typically labeling or immobilization) before measurement. Kinetic exclusion assays have been performed using unpurified molecules, in serum, and have measured binding to cell membrane proteins on intact whole cell which brings the measured binding interactions closer to their endogenous state.

Molecules suited for measurement by KinExA are antibodies, recombinant proteins, small molecules, aptamers, lipids, nanobodies, and toxins.

Kinetic exclusion assay have also been applied for concentration immunoassay, where it has proven capable of providing the maximum theoretical, K_{d} limited, sensitivity. An example of this technique has been employed for sensitive detection of environmental contaminants in near real-time.

== Standard equilibrium affinity analysis ==
A series of samples are prepared with all the same receptor (R) concentration but in which the ligand (L) concentration is titrated. After equilibrium is reached each sample is measured by flowing it through the column (Figure 2).

For 1:1 reversible binding Equilibrium Kd is defined as

(1) K_{d}≡k_{off}/k_{on} =R*L/RL

the binding is reversible so conservation of mass can be written as

(2) R_{T} = R+RL

(3) L_{T} = L +RL

Where:

K_{d} = equilibrium dissociation constant

k_{on} = forward rate constant

k_{off} = reverse rate constant

R = free receptor site concentration at equilibrium

L = free ligand site concentration at equilibrium

RL = concentration of complex at equilibrium

R_{T}= total concentration of receptors

L_{T} = total concentration of ligand

A simple equation relating the free fraction of R (=R/R_{T}) to the K_{d} and L_{T} is then fit to the measured data to find the K_{d} of the interaction.

== Rate constant analysis ==
To measure the rate constants, known concentrations of receptor and ligand are mixed in solution and the quantity of free receptor is repeatedly measured over time as the solution phase reaction occurs. The time course of the free receptor depletion is then fit with a standard bimolecular rate equation.

(4) dLR/dt = k_{on}∙R∙L - K_{d}∙k_{on}∙RL

where K_{d} * k_{on} has been substituted for k_{off} .
