= DASB =

Chemical compound

- DASB (above) and [C-11]DASB

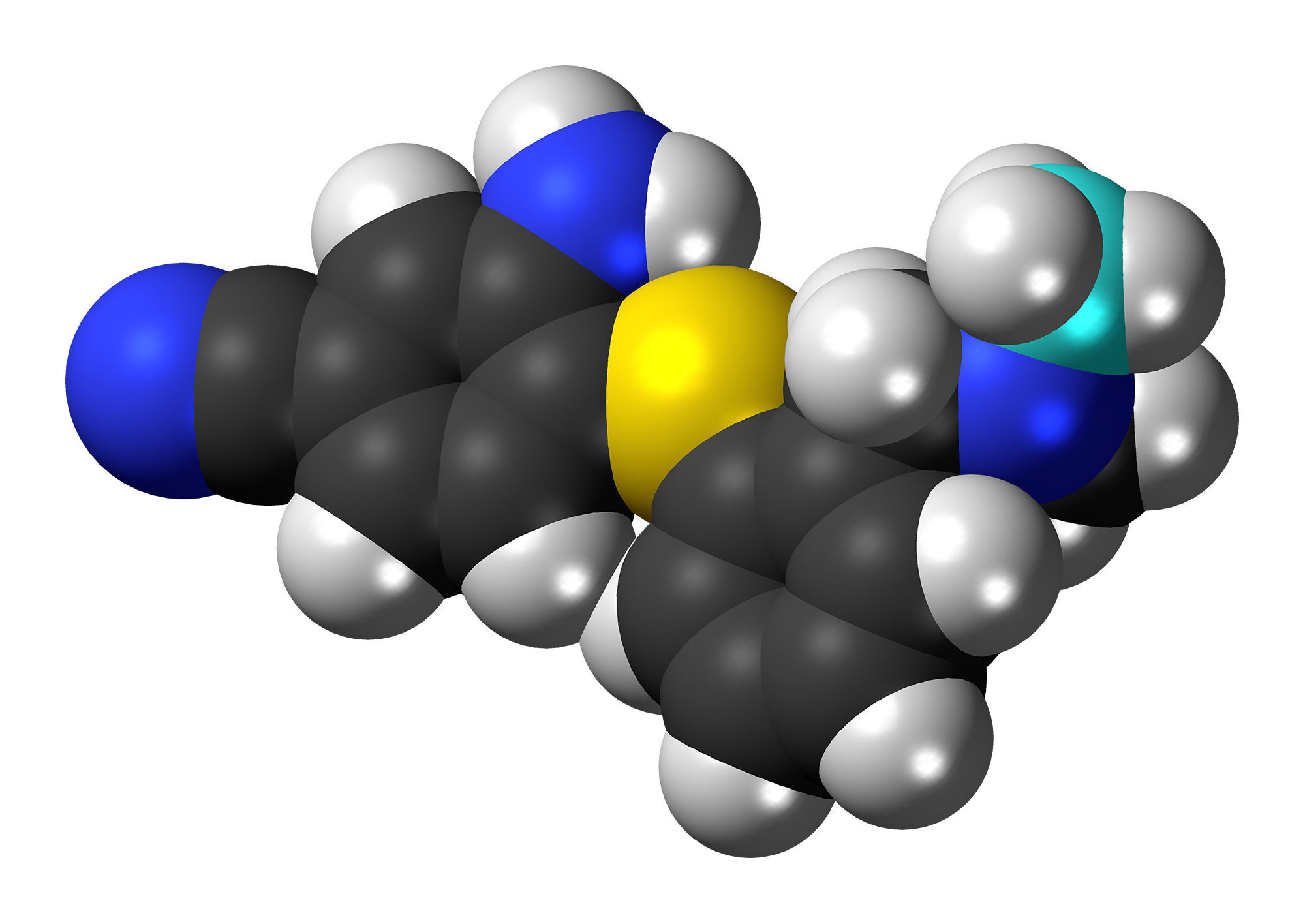
- Radioactive carbon atom marked in cyan

Identifiers
- IUPAC name: 3-amino-4-[2-[(di(methyl)amino)methyl]phenyl]sulfanylbenzonitrile
- CAS Number: 627490-01-1; 11C-labelled: 296774-13-5
- PubChem CID: 10446567; 11C-labelled: 656408
- ChemSpider: 8621986; 11C-labelled: 570800
- UNII: PP549Z0645; 11C-labelled: FJU46Q2BPU
- CompTox Dashboard (EPA): DTXSID001027386

Chemical and physical data
- Formula: C_{16}H_{17}N_{3}S
- Molar mass: 283.39 g·mol^{−1}
- 3D model (JSmol): Interactive image; 11C-labelled: Interactive image
- SMILES: N#Cc2ccc(Sc1c(cccc1)CN(C)C)c(c2)N; 11C-labelled: [11CH3]N(C)Cc1ccccc1Sc2ccc(cc2N)C#N
- InChI: InChI=1S/C16H17N3S/c1-19(2)11-13-5-3-4-6-15(13)20-16-8-7-12(10-17)9-14(16)18/h3-9H,11,18H2,1-2H3; Key:UVWLEPXXYOYDGR-UHFFFAOYSA-N; 11C-labelled: InChI=1S/C16H17N3S/c1-19(2)11-13-5-3-4-6-15(13)20-16-8-7-12(10-17)9-14(16)18/h3-9H,11,18H2,1-2H3/i1-1; Key:UVWLEPXXYOYDGR-BJUDXGSMSA-N

DASB, also known as 3-amino-4-(2-dimethylaminomethylphenylsulfanyl)-benzonitrile, is a compound that binds to the serotonin transporter. Labeled with carbon-11 — a radioactive isotope — it has been used as a radioligand in neuroimaging with positron emission tomography (PET) since around year 2000. In this context it is regarded as one of the superior radioligands for PET study of the serotonin transporter in the brain, since it has high selectivity for the serotonin transporter.

The DASB image from a human PET scan shows high binding in the midbrain, thalamus and striatum, moderate binding in the medial temporal lobe and anterior cingulate, and low binding in neocortex. The cerebellum is often regarded as a region with no specific serotonin transporter binding and the brain region is used as a reference in some studies.

Since the serotonin transporter is the target of SSRIs used in the treatment of major depression it has been natural to examine DASB binding in depressed patients. Several such research studies have been performed.

There are a number of alternative PET radioligands for imaging the serotonin transporter: [^{11}C]ADAM, [^{11}C]MADAM, [^{11}C]AFM, [^{11}C]DAPA, [^{11}C]McN5652, and [^{11}C]-NS 4194. A related molecule to DASB, that can be labeled with fluorine-18, has also been suggested as a PET radioligand. With single-photon emission computed tomography (SPECT) using the radioisotope iodine-123 there are further radioligands available: [^{123}I]ODAM, [^{123}I]IDAM, [^{123}I]ADAM, and [^{123}I]β-CIT. A few studies have examined the difference in binding between the radioligands in nonhuman primates, as well as in pigs.

Other compounds that can be labeled to work as PET radioligands for the study of the serotonin system are, e.g., altanserin and WAY-100635.

== Methodological issues ==
The binding potential of DASB can be estimated with kinetic modeling on a series of brain scans.

A test-retest reproducibility PET study indicates that [^{11}C]DASB can be used to measure the serotonin transporter parameters with high reliability in receptor-rich brain regions.

When the DASB neuroimages are analyzed the kinetic models suggested by Ichise and coworkers can be employed to estimate the binding potential. A test-retest reproducibility experiment has been performed to evaluate this approach.

== Studies ==
Besides the studies listed below a few occupancy studies have been reported.

DASB binding neuroimaging studies (patients compared to healthy control subjects).
What	Result	Subjects	Ref.
5-HTTLPR L_{A}L_{A} serotonin transporter genotype	Increase in putamen	43/30	
5-HTTLPR L_{A}L_{A} serotonin transporter genotype	Increase in midbrain	19	
5-HTTLPR L_{A}L_{A} serotonin transporter genotype	No difference	63	
Age	No effect found		
Body mass index	Inverse correlation (?)	?	
Seasonality	Higher in winter in putamen and caudate	54	
Seasonality	Higher in fall and winter	88	
NEO PI-R Neuroticism	Positive correlation in thalamus	31 males	
Disease
Depressed during major depressive episodes	No difference found	20+20	
Depressed with highly negativistic "dysfunctional attitudes" during major depressive episodes	Increase in prefrontal cortex, anterior cingulate, thalamus, bilateral caudate, and bilateral putamen	20(?)+20	
Recovered depressed patients	No difference found	24+20 males	
Unipolar depression	Increase in thalamus, insula and striatum	18+34	
Unmedicated unipolar major depression	Reduced 5-HTT availability in the thalamus		
TCI anxiety in unmedicated unipolar major depression	Reduced 5-HTT availability in the thalamus, midbrain and amygdala		
Bipolar depression	Increase in thalamus, insula and striatum	18+34	
Bipolar depression	Decrease in midbrain, amygdala, hippocampus, thalamus, putamen, and anterior cingulate cortex	18+41	
Obsessive compulsive disorder	Reduction and correlation with severity in thalamus and midbrain	9+19	
Alcoholism	No significant alteration	30 + 18	
Parkinson's disease	Reduction in forebrain	5+8	
Non-depressed Parkinson's disease	Decreased binding in caudate, midbrain, putamen, orbitofrontal cortex and (non-significantly) dorsolateral prefrontal cortex		
Depressed Parkinson's disease patients	Increase in prefrontal and dorsolateral cortices	7+7	
Drug/intervention
Abstinent MDMA ('Ecstasy') users	Global reduction	23+19	
Former MDMA users and polydrug users	No significant difference in brain regions examined	12+9+19	
Reduced synaptic serotonin (by rapid tryptophan depletion)	(small reduction in binding potential)	8	
Lowering of brain serotonin (by acute tryptophan depletion)	No change observed	25 (14)	
