= Receptor–ligand kinetics =

Branch of chemical kinetics

In biochemistry, receptor–ligand kinetics is a branch of chemical kinetics in which the kinetic species are defined by different non-covalent bindings and/or conformations of the molecules involved, which are denoted as receptor(s) and ligand(s). Receptor–ligand binding kinetics also involves the on- and off-rates of binding.

A main goal of receptor–ligand kinetics is to determine the concentrations of the various kinetic species (i.e., the states of the receptor and ligand) at all times, from a given set of initial concentrations and a given set of rate constants. In a few cases, an analytical solution of the rate equations may be determined, but this is relatively rare. However, most rate equations can be integrated numerically, or approximately, using the steady-state approximation. A less ambitious goal is to determine the final equilibrium concentrations of the kinetic species, which is adequate for the interpretation of equilibrium binding data.

A converse goal of receptor–ligand kinetics is to estimate the rate constants and/or dissociation constants of the receptors and ligands from experimental kinetic or equilibrium data. The total concentrations of receptor and ligands are sometimes varied systematically to estimate these constants.

== Binding kinetics ==
The binding constant is a special case of the equilibrium constant $K$. It is associated with the binding and unbinding reaction of receptor (R) and ligand (L) molecules, which is formalized as:

$$\ce{{R} + {L} <=> {RL}}$$.

The reaction is characterized by the on-rate constant $k_{\rm on}$ and the off-rate constant $k_{\rm off}$, which have units of 1/(concentration time) and 1/time, respectively. In equilibrium, the forward binding transition $\ce{{R} + {L} -> {RL}}$ should be balanced by the backward unbinding transition $\ce{{RL} -> {R} + {L}}$. That is,

$$k_\ce{on}\,[\ce{R}]\,[\ce{L}] = k_\ce{off}\,[\ce{RL}]$$,

where $\ce{[{R}]}$, $\ce{[{L}]}$ and $\ce{[{RL}]}$ represent the concentration of unbound free receptors, the concentration of unbound free ligand and the concentration of receptor-ligand complexes. The binding constant, or the association constant $K_{\rm a}$ is defined by

$$K_{\rm a} = { k_\ce{on} \over k_\ce{off} } = { \ce{ [{RL}] \over [{R}]\,[{L}] } }$$.

== Simplest case: single receptor and single ligand bind to form a complex ==
The simplest example of receptor–ligand kinetics is that of a single ligand L binding to a single receptor R to form a single complex C

$$\ce{{R} + {L} <-> {C}}$$

The equilibrium concentrations are related by the dissociation constant K_{d}

$$K_{d} \ \stackrel{\mathrm{def}}{=}\   \frac{k_{-1}}{k_{1}} = \frac{[\ce{R}]_{eq} [\ce{L}]_{eq}}{[\ce{C}]_{eq}}$$

where k_{1} and k_{−1} are the forward and backward rate constants, respectively. The total concentrations of receptor and ligand in the system are constant

$$R_{tot} \ \stackrel{\mathrm{def}}{=}\   [\ce{R}] + [\ce{C}]$$

$$L_{tot} \ \stackrel{\mathrm{def}}{=}\   [\ce{L}] + [\ce{C}]$$

Thus, only one concentration of the three ([R], [L] and [C]) is independent; the other two concentrations may be determined from R_{tot}, L_{tot} and the independent concentration.

This system is one of the few systems whose kinetics can be determined analytically. Choosing [R] as the independent concentration and representing the concentrations by italic variables for brevity (e.g., $R \ \stackrel{\mathrm{def}}{=}\ [\ce{R}]$), the kinetic rate equation can be written

$$\frac{dR}{dt} = -k_{1} R L + k_{-1} C = -k_{1} R (L_{tot} - R_{tot} + R) + k_{-1} (R_{tot} - R)$$

Dividing both sides by k_{1} and introducing the constant 2E = R_{tot} - L_{tot} - K_{d}, the rate equation becomes

$$\frac{1}{k_{1}} \frac{dR}{dt} = -R^{2} + 2ER + K_{d}R_{tot} =
-\left( R - R_{+}\right) \left( R - R_{-}\right)$$

where the two equilibrium concentrations $R_{\pm} \ \stackrel{\mathrm{def}}{=}\ E \pm D$ are given by the quadratic formula and D is defined

$$D \ \stackrel{\mathrm{def}}{=}\   \sqrt{E^{2} + R_{tot} K_{d}}$$

However, only the $R_{+}$ equilibrium has a positive concentration, corresponding to the equilibrium observed experimentally.

Separation of variables and a partial-fraction expansion yield the integrable ordinary differential equation

$$\left\{ \frac{1}{R - R_{+}} - \frac{1}{R - R_{-}} \right\} dR = -2 D k_{1} dt$$

whose solution is

$$\log \left| R - R_{+} \right| - \log \left| R - R_{-} \right| = -2Dk_{1}t + \phi_{0}$$

or, equivalently,

$$g = exp(-2Dk_{1}t+\phi_{0})$$

$R(t) = \frac{R_{+} - gR_{-}}{1 - g}$

for association, and

$R(t) = \frac{R_{+} + gR_{-}}{1 + g}$

for dissociation, respectively; where the integration constant φ_{0} is defined

$$\phi_{0} \ \stackrel{\mathrm{def}}{=}\   \log \left| R(t=0) - R_{+} \right| - \log \left| R(t=0) - R_{-} \right|$$

From this solution, the corresponding solutions for the other concentrations $C(t)$ and $L(t)$ can be obtained.

== See also ==
- Binding potential
- Patlak plot
- Scatchard plot
