= 5-HTTLPR =

Genetic polymorphism

SNP: rs25531
- Gene: SLC6A4
- Chromosome: 17

External databases
- Ensembl: Human SNPView
- dbSNP: 25531
- HapMap: 25531
- SNPedia: 25531

5-HTTLPR (serotonin-transporter-linked promoter region) is a degenerate repeat (redundancy in the genetic code) polymorphic region in SLC6A4, the gene that codes for the serotonin transporter. Since the polymorphism was identified in the middle of the 1990s, it has been extensively investigated, e.g., in connection with neuropsychiatric disorders. A 2006 scientific article stated that "over 300 behavioral, psychiatric, pharmacogenetic and other medical genetics papers" had analyzed the polymorphism. While often discussed as an example of gene-environment interaction, this contention is contested.

== Alleles ==
The serotonin transporter gene (SLC6A4) with the 5-HTTLPR is located on chromosome 17.

The polymorphism occurs in the promoter region of the gene. Researchers commonly report it with two variations in humans: A short ("s") and a long ("l"), but it can be subdivided further. The short (s)- and long (l)- alleles have been thought to be related to stress and psychiatric disorders. In connection with the region are two single nucleotide polymorphisms (SNP): rs25531 and rs25532.

One study published in 2000 found 14 allelic variants (14-A, 14-B, 14-C, 14-D, 15, 16-A, 16-B, 16-C, 16-D, 16-E, 16-F, 19, 20 and 22) in a group of around 200 Japanese and Europeans. The difference between 16-A and 16-D is the rs25531 SNP. It is also the difference between 14-A and 14-D.

Some studies have found that long allele results in higher serotonin transporter mRNA transcription in human cell lines. The higher level may be due to the A-allele of rs25531, such that subjects with the long-rs25531(A) allelic combination (sometimes written L_{A}) have higher levels while long-rs25531(G) carriers have levels more similar to short-allele carriers. Newer studies examining the effects of genotype may compare the L_{A}/L_{A} genotype against all other genotypes. The allele frequency of this polymorphism seems to vary considerably across populations, with a higher frequency of the long allele in Europe and lower frequency in Asia. It is argued that the population variation in the allele frequency is more likely due to neutral evolutionary processes than natural selection.

== Neuropsychiatric disorders ==
In the 1990s it has been speculated that the polymorphism might be related to affective disorders, and an initial study found such a link. However, another large European study found no such link. A decade later two studies found that 5-HTT polymorphism influences depressive responses to life stress; an example of gene-environment interaction (GxE) not considered in the previous studies. However, a 2017 meta-analysis found no such association. Earlier, two 2009 meta-analyses found no overall GxE effect, while a 2011 meta-analysis, demonstrated a positive result. In turn, the 2011 meta-analysis has been criticized as being overly inclusive (e.g. including hip fractures as outcomes), for deeming a study supportive of the GxE interaction which is actually in the opposite direction, and because of substantial evidence of publication bias and data mining in the literature. This criticism points out that if the original finding were real, and not the result of publication bias, we would expect that those replication studies which are closest in design to the original are the most likely to replicate—instead we find the opposite. This suggests that authors may be data dredging for measures and analytic strategies which yield the results they want.

=== Treatment response ===
With the results from one study the polymorphism was thought to be related to treatment response so that long-allele patients respond better to antidepressants. Another antidepressant treatment response study did, however, rather point to the rs25531 SNP, and a large study by the group of investigators found a "lack of association between response to an SSRI and variation at the SLC6A4 locus".

One study could find a treatment response effect for repetitive transcranial magnetic stimulation to drug-resistant depression with long/long homozygotes benefitting more than short-allele carriers. The researchers found a similar effect for the Val66Met polymorphism in the BDNF gene.

=== Amygdala ===
The 5-HTTLPR has been thought to predispose individuals to affective disorders such as anxiety and depression. There have been some studies that test whether this association is due to the effects of variation in 5-HTTLPR on the reactivity of the human amygdala. In order to test this, researchers gathered a group of subjects and administered a harm avoidance (HA) subset of the Tridimensional Personality Questionnaire as an initial mood and personality assessment. Subjects also had their DNA isolated and analyzed in order to be genotyped. Next, the amygdala was then engaged by having the subject match fearful facial expressions during an fMRI scan (by the 3-T GE Signa scanner). The results of the study showed that there was bilateral activity in the amygdala for every subject when processing the fearful images, as expected. However, the activity in the right amygdala was much higher for subjects with the s-allele, which shows that the 5-HTTLPR has an effect on amygdala activity. There did not seem to be the same effect on the left amygdala.

== Insomnia ==
There has been speculation that the 5-HTTLPR gene is associated with insomnia and sleep quality. Primary insomnia is one of the most common sleep disorders and is defined as having trouble falling or staying asleep, enough to cause distress in one's life. Serotonin (5-HT) has been associated with the regulation of sleep for a very long time now. The 5-HT transporter (5-HTT) is the main regulator of serotonin and serotonergic energy and is therefore targeted by many antidepressants. There also have been several family and twin studies that suggest that insomnia is heavily genetically influenced. Many of these studies have found that there is a genetic and environment dual-factor that influences insomnia. It has been hypothesized that the short 5-HTTLPR genotype is related to poor sleep quality and, therefore, also primary insomnia. Research studies have found that this variation does not cause insomnia, but rather may predispose an individual to experience worse quality of sleep when faced with a stressful life event.

=== Brummett ===
The effect that the 5-HTTLPR gene had on sleep quality was tested by Brummett in a study conducted at Duke University Medical Center from 2001 to 2004. The sleep quality of 344 participants was measured using The Pittsburgh Sleep Quality Index. The study found that caregivers with the homozygous s-allele had poorer sleep quality, which shows that the stress of caregiving combined with the allele gave way to worse sleep quality. Although the study found that the 5-HTTLPR genotype did not directly affect sleep quality, the 5-HTTLPR polymorphism's effect on sleep quality was magnified by one's environmental stress. It supports the notion that the 5-HTTLPR s-allele is what leads to hyperarousal when exposed to stress; hyperarousability is commonly associated with insomnia.

=== Deuschle ===
However, in a 2007 study conducted by a sleep laboratory in Germany, it was found that the 5-HTTLPR gene did have a strong association with both insomnia and depression both in participants with and without lifetime affective disorders. This study included 157 insomnia patients and a control group of 836 individuals that had no psychiatric disorders. The subjects were then genotyped through polymerase chain reaction (PCR) techniques. The researchers found that the s-allele was greater represented in the vast majority of patients with insomnia compared to those who had no disorder. This shows that there is an association between the 5-HTTPLR genotype and primary insomnia. However, it is important to consider the fact that there was a very limited number of subjects with insomnia tested in this study.

== Personality traits ==
5-HTTLPR may be related to personality traits: Two 2004 meta-analyses found 26 research studies investigating the polymorphism in relation to anxiety-related traits. The initial and classic 1996 study found s-allele carriers to on average have slightly higher neuroticism score with the NEO PI-R personality questionnaire, and this result was replicated by the group with new data. Some other studies have, however, failed to find this association, nor with peer-rated neuroticism, and a 2006 review noted the "erratic success in replication" of the first finding. A meta-analysis published in 2004 stated that the lack of replicability was "largely due to small sample size and the use of different inventories". They found that neuroticism as measured with the NEO-family of personality inventories had quite significant association with 5-HTTLPR while the trait harm avoidance from the Temperament and Character Inventory family did not have any significant association. A similar conclusion was reached in an updated 2008 meta-analysis. However, based on over 4000 subjects, the largest study that used the NEO PI-R found no association between variants of the serotonin transporter gene (including 5-HTTLPR) and neuroticism, or its facets (Anxiety, Angry-Hostility, Depression, Self-Consciousness, Impulsiveness, and Vulnerability).

In a study published in 2009, authors found that individuals homozygous for the long allele of 5-HTTLPR paid more attention on average to positive affective pictures while selectively avoiding negative affective pictures presented alongside the positive pictures compared to their heterozygous and short-allele-homozygous peers. This biased attention of positive emotional stimuli suggests they may tend to be more optimistic. Other research indicates carriers of the short 5-HTTLPR allele have difficulty disengaging attention from emotional stimuli compared to long allele homozygotes. Another study published in 2009 using an eye tracking assessment of information processing found that short 5-HTTLPR allele carriers displayed an eye gaze bias to view positive scenes and avoid negative scenes, while long allele homozygotes viewed the emotion scenes in a more even-handed fashion. This research suggests that short 5-HTTLPR allele carriers may be more sensitive to emotional information in the environment than long allele homozygotes.

Another research group have given evidence for a modest association between shyness and the long form in grade school children. This is, however, just a single report and the link is not investigated as intensively as for the anxiety-related traits.

== Neuroimaging ==
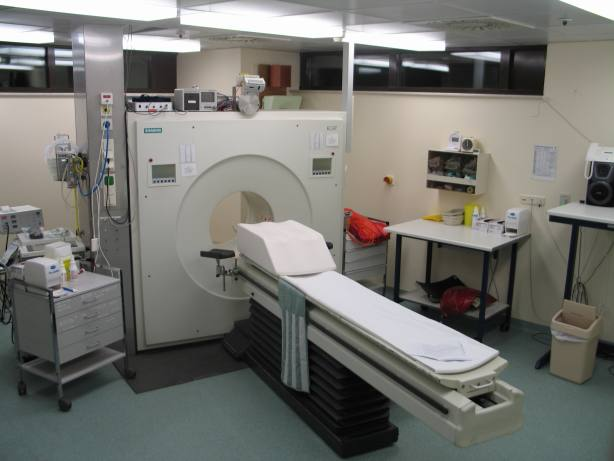
Molecular neuroimaging studies may use PET scanners such as this type for examining the effect of the 5-HTTLPR genotypes on serotonin transporter binding in the human brain.

Molecular neuroimaging studies have examined the association between genotype and serotonin transporter binding with positron emission tomography (PET) and SPECT brain scanners. Such studies use a radioligand that binds—preferably selectively—to the serotonin transporter so an image can be formed that quantifies the distribution of the serotonin transporter in the brain. One study could see no difference in serotonin transporter availability between long/long and short/short homozygotes subjects among 96 subjects scanned with SPECT using the iodine-123 β-CIT radioligand. Using the PET radioligand carbon-11-labeled McN 5652 another research team could neither find any difference in serotonin transporter binding between genotype groups. Newer studies have used the radioligand carbon-11-labeled DASB with one study finding higher serotonin transporter binding in the putamen of L_{A} homozygotes compared to other genotypes. Another study with similar radioligand and genotype comparison found higher binding in the midbrain.

Associations between the polymorphism and the grey matter in parts of the anterior cingulate brain region have also been reported based on magnetic resonance imaging brain scannings and voxel-based morphometry analysis. 5-HTTLPR short allele–driven amygdala hyperreactivity was confirmed in a large (by MRI study standards) cohort of healthy subjects with no history of psychiatric illness or treatment. Brain blood flow measurements with positron emission tomography brain scanners can show genotype-related changes. The glucose metabolism in the brain has also been investigated with respect to the polymorphism, and the functional magnetic resonance imaging (fMRI) brain scans have also been correlated to the polymorphism.

Especially the amygdala brain structure has been the focus of the functional neuroimaging studies.

== Electrophysiology ==
The relationship between the Event Related Potentials P3a and P3b and the genetic variants of 5-HTTLPR were investigated using an auditory oddball paradigm and revealed short allele homozygotes mimicked those of COMT met/met homozygotes with an enhancement of the frontal, but not parietal P3a and P3b. This suggests a frontal-cortical dopaminergic and serotonergic mechanism in bottom-up attentional capture.

== Other organisms ==
In rats (Rattus rattus) berberine increases 5-HTTLPR activity.
