= Giuseppe Di Giovanni =

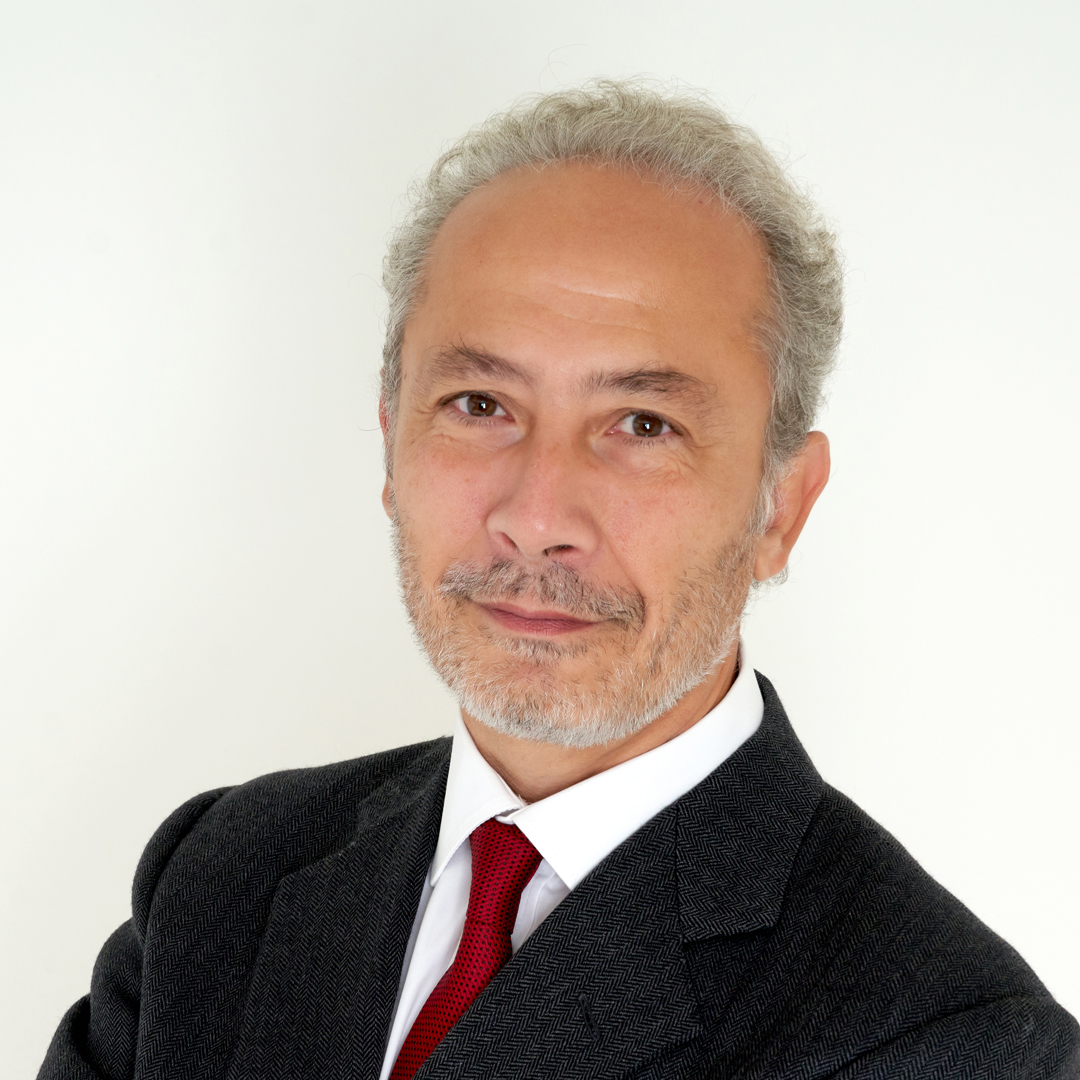

Giuseppe Di Giovanni, Cavaliere (born 24 May 1968; Palermo, Italy) is a Professor of Human Physiology and Neuroscience at the Magna Græcia University of Catanzaro, Italy.

== Early life ==
Di Giovanni Giuseppe received his PhD in Neuroscience from the University of Chieti, Italy and was a postdoctoral fellow at Yale University, CT, USA.

== Career ==
He served as a Senior Lecturer of Human Physiology at the Faculty of Medicine and Surgery, University of Palermo. Later he became Professor of Human Physiology and Neuroscience at the University of Malta, as well as an Honorary Professor at the Neuroscience Division of the School Biosciences at Cardiff University, UK. He is also an Adjunct Professor at Korea University, School of Medicine in Korea, Seoul. He is currently a Full Professor of Human Physiology at the Medical School of the Magna Græcia University, Catanzaro, Italy. His main research interests are in experimental neurology and biological psychiatry. Specifically, he is interested in the pathophysiological role of cannabinoids and serotonin, and especially of the 5-HT_{2C} receptors, in brain disorders, such as epilepsy, depression, drugs of abuse and Parkinson's disease. He has published more than 160 articles in top biomedical journals including Nature Medicine and Nature Neuroscience, 15 books and several journal special issues. He is the Past-President of the "Mediterranean Neuroscience Society (MNS) the President of the Malta Physiological Society and the Treasurer of the Malta Neuroscience Network. He is the Editor-in-Chief of the prestigious Journal of Neuroscience Methods by Elsevier, Amsterdam, Netherlands and the Editor of the book series "The Receptors" by Springer, USA and serves as associate editor for the CNS Neuroscience & Therapeutics by Wiley. On 28 May 2020 he was awarded the honour of Cavaliere (Knight) of the Order of the Star of Italy by the President of the Italian Republic Sergio Mattarella. He was listed among the World’s Top 2% Scientists ranking for his work in 2019 and 2020 in the field of Neuroscience. In 2022, he was elected a member of Academia Europaea, due to his achievements in Physiology and Neuroscience research and Secretary-General of IBRO, the International Brain Research Organization, for the term January 2023 – December 2025.
