= Free fraction =

Pharmacokinetics parameter

The free fraction is a parameter in pharmacokinetics and receptor-ligand kinetics. One speaks of two different free fractions:

- Plasma free fraction, previously referred to as ƒ_{1}, is now referred to as ƒ_{P} according to consensus nomenclature.
- Tissue free fraction (ƒ_{ND}), previously referred to as ƒ_{2}

The plasma free fraction is the fraction of the ligand at equilibrium in blood plasma that is not bound to plasma proteins.

== See also ==
- Binding potential
