= International Journal of Neural Systems =

Neuroscience journal

- Discipline: Neurocomputation
- Language: English
- Edited by: Hojjat Adeli

Publication details
- History: 1989-present
- Publisher: World Scientific
- Impact factor: 6.507 (2014)

Standard abbreviations
- ISO 4: Int. J. Neural Syst.

Indexing
- ISSN: 0129-0657 (print); 1793-6462 (web)

Links
- Journal homepage

The International Journal of Neural Systems is a bimonthly peer-reviewed scientific journal founded in 1989. It is published by World Scientific and covers information processing in natural and artificial neural systems.

== Abstracting and indexing ==
The journal is abstracted and indexed in:

- Inspec
- PubMed
- CSA Neurosciences Abstracts
- Zentralblatt MATH
- Science Citation Index Expanded
- CompuMath Citation Index
- Current Contents/Engineering, Computing, and Technology
