= History of neuroimaging =

Neuroimaging is a medical technique that allows doctors and researchers to take pictures of the inner workings of the body or brain of a patient. It can show areas with heightened activity, areas with high or low blood flow, the structure of the patients brain/body, as well as certain abnormalities. Neuroimaging is most often used to find the specific location of certain diseases or birth defects such as tumors, cancers, or clogged arteries. Neuroimaging first came about as a medical technique in the 1880s with the invention of the human circulation balance and has since lead to other inventions such as the x-ray, air ventriculography, cerebral angiography, PET/SPECT scans, magnetoencephalography, and xenon CT scanning.

== Neuroimaging techniques ==
=== Human circulation balance ===
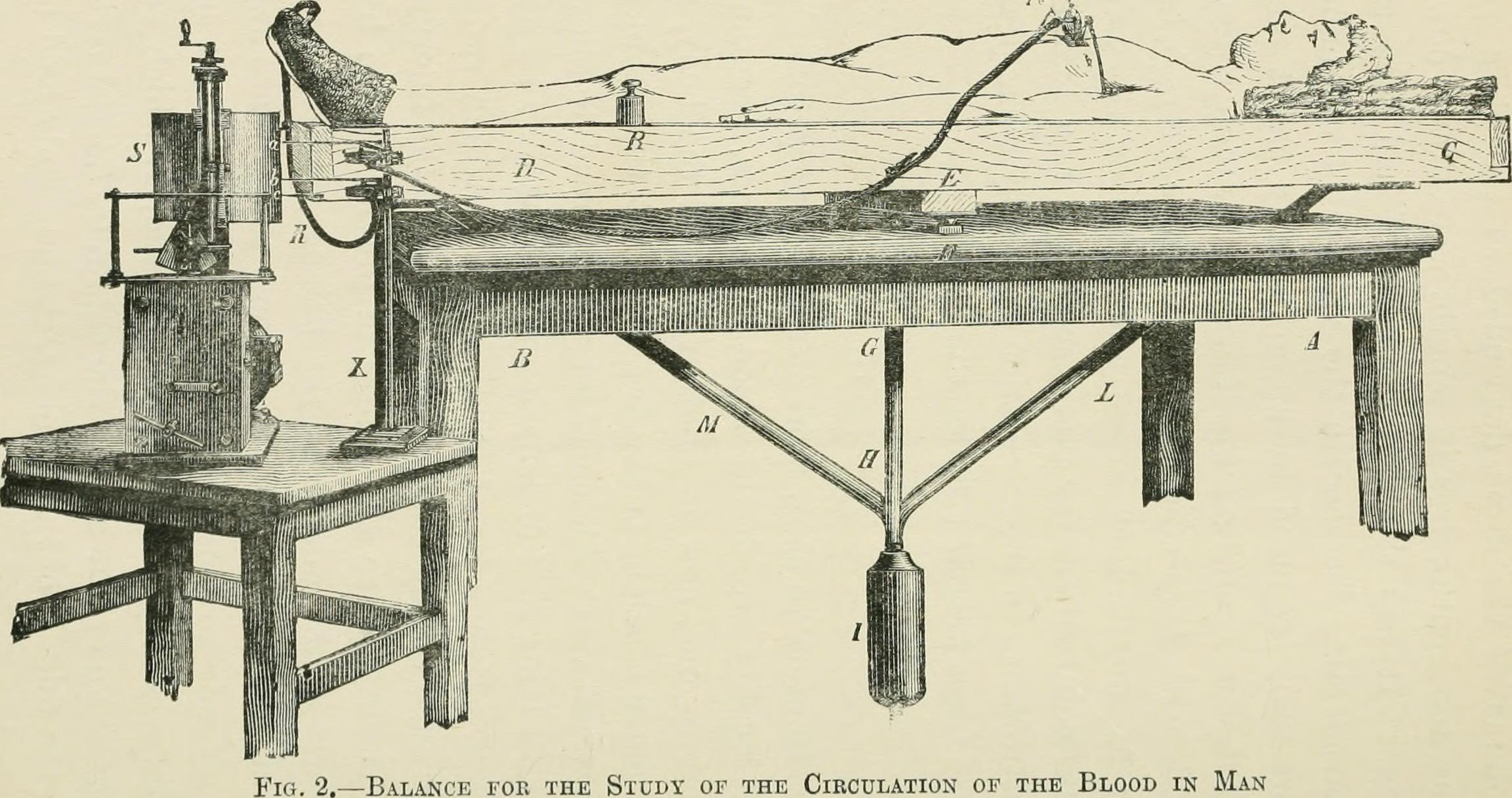
Angelo Mosso's 'human circulation balance.'

The 'human circulation balance' was a non-invasive way to measure blood flow to the brain during mental activities. This technique worked by placing patients on a table that was supported by a fulcrum, allowing the table to sway depending on activity levels. When patients were exposed to more cognitively complex stimuli, the table would sway towards the head. Invented in 1882 by Angelo Mosso, the 'human circulation balance' is said to be the first technique of neuroimaging created and is what Mosso is most known for.

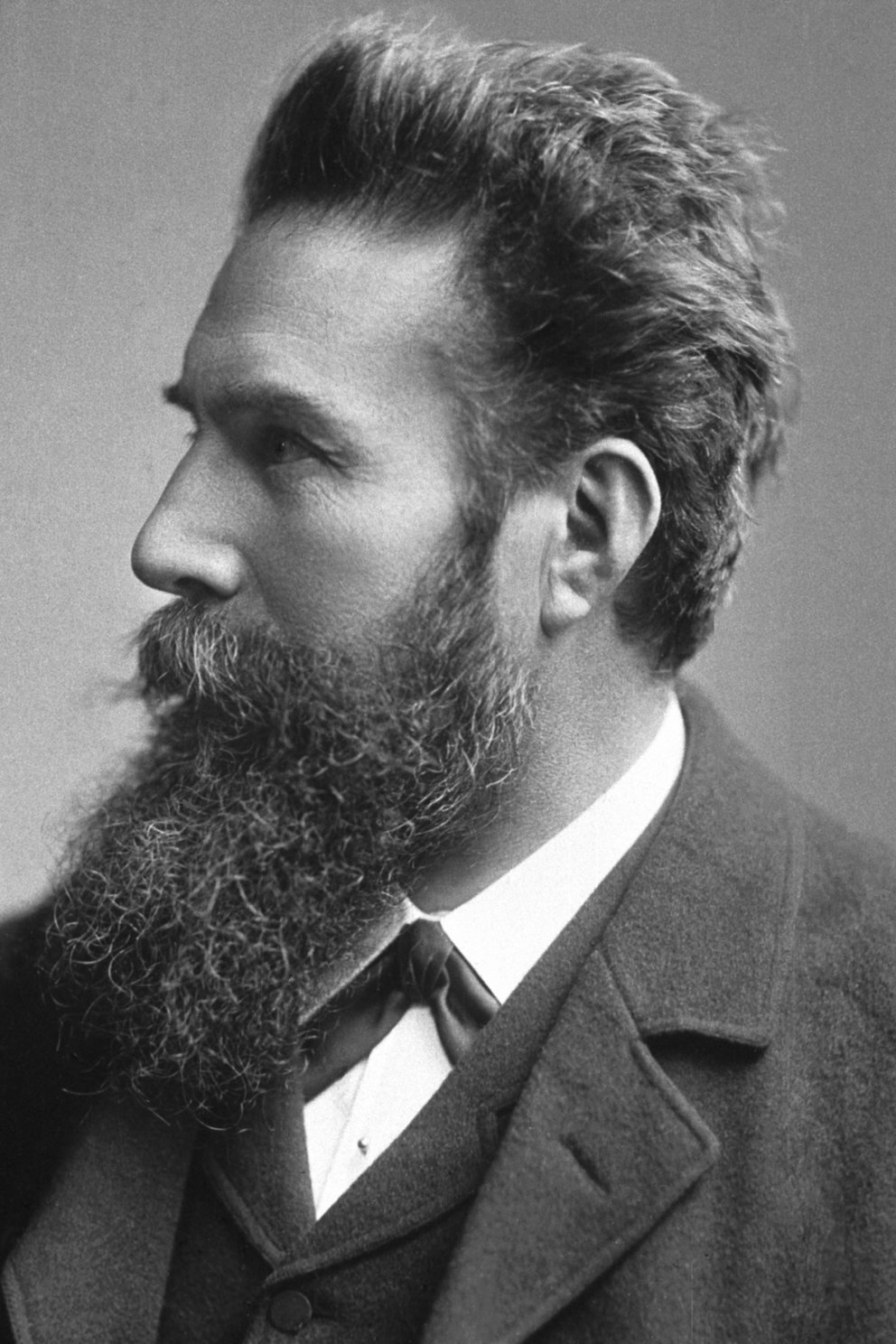
Wilhelm Roentgen, creator of the X-ray.

=== X-ray ===
In the year of 1895, Wilhelm Roentgen developed the first radiograph, more commonly known as the X-ray. By 1901, Roentgen had been awarded the first Nobel Prize in Physics for his discovery. Immediately after its release, X-ray machines were being manufactured and used worldwide in medicine. The brain is almost entirely composed of soft tissue that is not radio-opaque, meaning it remains essentially invisible to ordinary or plain X-ray examinations. This is also true of most brain abnormalities, though there are exceptions. For example, a calcified tumor (e.g.,meningioma, craniopharyngioma, and some types of glioma) can easily be seen.

=== Air ventriculography ===
To combat this, in 1918, neurosurgeon Walter Dandy developed a technique called air ventriculography. This method injected filtered air directly into the lateral ventricles to better take pictures of the ventricle systems of the brain. Thanks to local anesthetics, this was not a painful procedure, but it was significantly risky. Hemorrhage, severe infection, and extreme changes in intrarenal pressure were all threats to the procedure. Despite this, Dandy did not stop there. In 1919, he proceeded to discover Encephalography, a medical procedure used to record the brain's electrical activity. This method involved attaching sensors to the brain that detect and measure the brain's electrical signals. These signals are then translated into a visual, showing the brain's activity patterns. With these early advances, neuroimaging was beginning to be used to diagnose conditions such as epilepsy, brain injuries, and sleep disorders. Providing invaluable information about brain function that would one day be added upon during the devolvement of modern neuroimaging.

=== Cerebral angiography ===
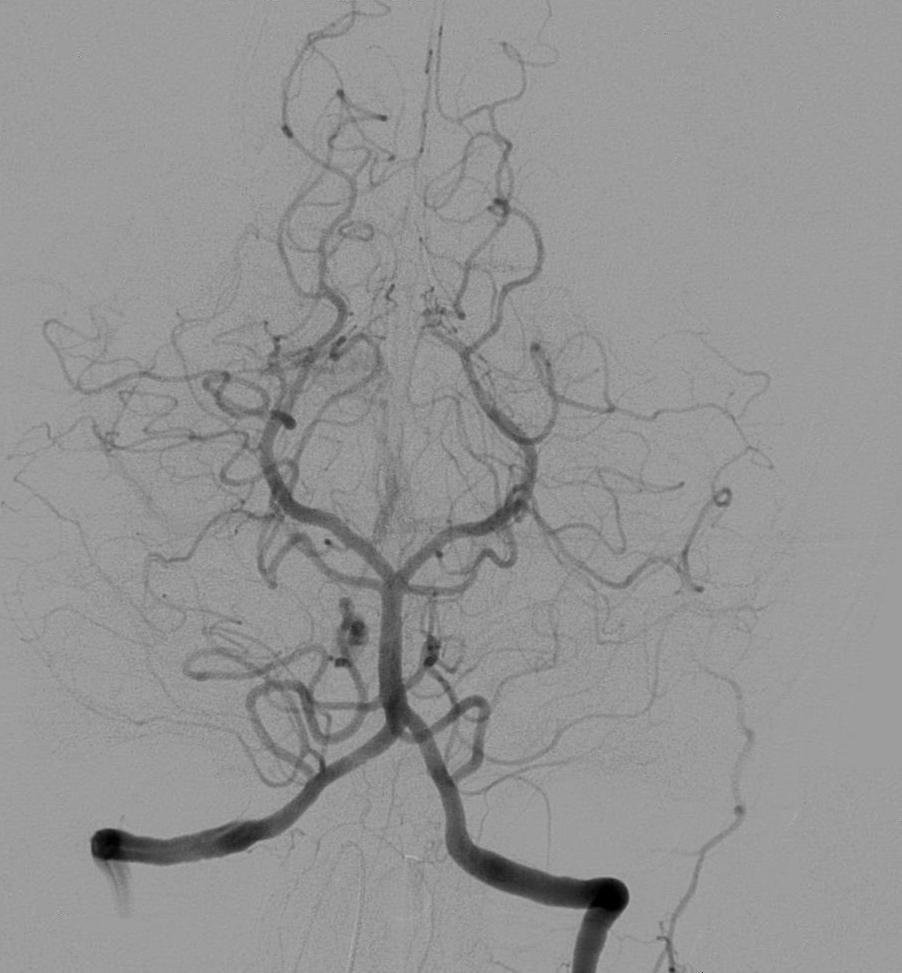
Cerebral angiogram showing a transverse projection of the vertebrobasilar and posterior cerebral circulation.

Introduced in 1927, cerebral angiography enabled doctors to accurately detect and diagnose anomalies in the brain such as tumors and internal carotid artery occlusions. Over the course of a year, Egas Moniz, the inventor of cerebral angiography, ran experiments with various dye solution percentages that were injected into arteries to help better visualize the blood vessels in the brain before discovering that a solution consisting of 25% sodium iodide was the safest for patients, as well as the most effective in the visualization of blood vessels and arteries within the brain.

=== PET/SPECT scans ===
Full body PET scan of an adult female.

A positron emission tomography, or PET scan, is a scan that shows areas of high activity in the body. The way it works is that a patient is first given a radioactive substance (called a tracer) via an injection in the hand or arm. The tracer then circulates through the body and attaches to a specific substance that the organ or tissue produces during metabolism, such as glucose. As a result, positrons are created, and those positrons are scanned by the PET camera. After they are scanned, a computer produces either a 2D or 3D image of the activity occurring within the organ or tissue. The idea for the PET scan was originally proposed by William Sweet in the 1950s, but the first full-body PET scanner wasn't actually developed until 1974 by Michael Phelp.

Similarly, the single-photon emission computed tomography scan, or SPECT scan, also works by scanning a tracer within the patient. The difference, however, is that the SPECT directly scans the gamma rays from where the tracer attaches rather than the positrons that the PET scans. As a result, the images that the SPECT scan creates are not as clear as the images produced by a PET scan, but it's typically a cheaper procedure to undertake. SPECT was developed by David Kuhl in the 1950s. Kuhl also helped set the foundation that would lead to the PET scan.

=== Magnetoencephalography ===
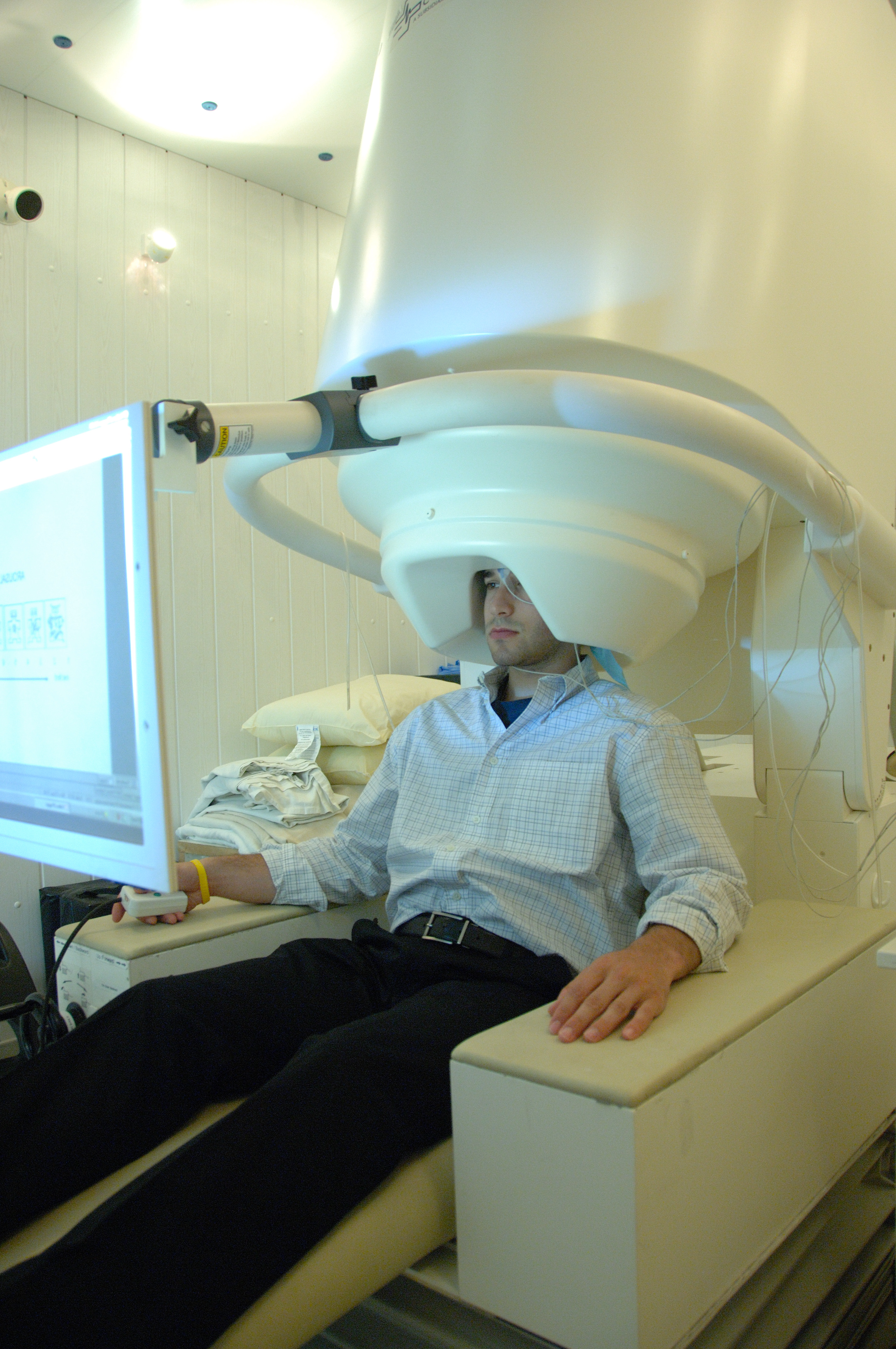
MEG device with patient.

Magnetoencephalography (MEG) is a technique that looks for regions of activity in the brain by detecting large groups of electrically charged ions moving through cells. It was originally developed by physicist David Cohen in the early 1970s as a noninvasive procedure. In order to be noninvasive, the MEG was designed like a giant helmet that the patient would put their head inside of and, once turned on, would read the electromagnetic pulses coming from their brain. Later on, in 1972, Cohen invented the SQUID (superconducting quantum interference device), which gave the MEG the ability to detect extremely small changes in ions and magnetic fields in the brain.

=== Xenon CT scanning ===
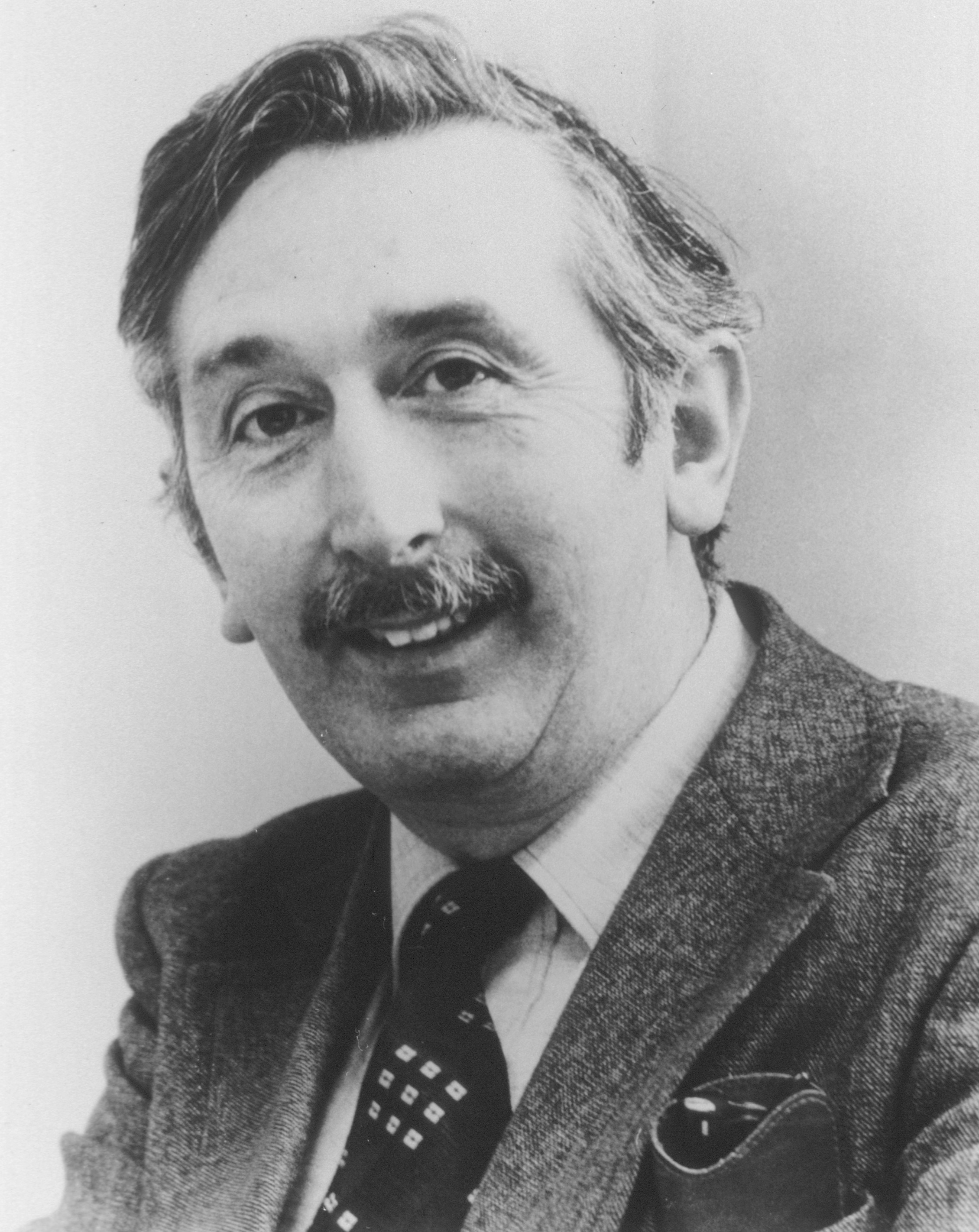
Godfrey Hounsfield, inventor of first CT scanner

Xenon computed tomography is a modern scanning technique that reveals the flow of blood to the areas of the brain. The scan tests for consistent and sufficient blood flow to all areas of the brain by having patients breathe in xenon gas, a contrast agent, to show the areas of high and low blood flow. Although many trial scans and tests were run during the development process of computed tomography, British biomedical engineer Godfrey Hounsfield is the founder of the technique and invented the first CT scanner in 1967, which he won a Nobel Prize for in 1979. However, the adoption of the scanners in the United States didn't occur until six years later in 1973. Regardless, the CT scanner was already gaining a notable reputation and popularity beforehand.

=== Magnetic resonance imaging ===
Shortly after the initial development of CT, magnetic resonance imaging (MRI or MR scanning) was developed. Rather than using ionizing or X-radiation, MRI uses the variation in signals produced by protons in the body when the head is placed in a strong magnetic field. Associated with early application of the basic technique to the human body are the names of Jackson (in 1968), Damadian (in 1972), and Abe and Paul Lauterbur (in 1973). Lauterbur and Sir Peter Mansfield were awarded the 2003 Nobel Prize in Physiology or Medicine for their discoveries concerning MRI. At first, structural imaging benefited more than functional imaging from the introduction of MRI. During the 1980s a veritable explosion of technical refinements and diagnostic MR applications took place, enabling even neurological tyros to diagnose brain pathology that would have been elusive or incapable of demonstration in a living person only a decade or two earlier.
