= Journal of Neuroscience Methods =

- Discipline: Neuroscience
- Language: English
- Edited by: Giuseppe Di Giovanni

Publication details
- History: 1979-present
- Publisher: Elsevier
- Frequency: 18/year
- Open access: Hybrid
- Impact factor: 3.0 (2022)

Standard abbreviations
- ISO 4: J. Neurosci. Methods

Indexing
- CODEN: JNMEDT
- ISSN: 0165-0270 (print); 1872-678X (web)
- OCLC no.: 04929303

Links
- Journal homepage; Online archive

The Journal of Neuroscience Methods is a peer-reviewed scientific journal covering scientific techniques and protocols used in any branch of neuroscience research. It was established in 1979. The editor-in-chief is Giuseppe Di Giovanni, Professor of Neuroscience at the University of Malta and Honorary Professor at Cardiff University, UK. Journal Neuroscience Methods is published 18 times a year by Elsevier.

Associate Editors: Vince Calhoun (The Mind Research Network, Albuquerque, New Mexico, USA), Jing Jin (East China University of Science and Technology, Shanghai, China), Philippe De Deurwaerdère (Université de Bordeaux, Bordeaux Cedex, France), Robert Hampson (Wake Forest University Health Sciences, Winston-Salem, North Carolina, USA), Liset Menendez de la Prida (Consejo Superior de Investigaciones Científicas (CSIC), Madrid, Spain), Patrizia Campolongo (University of Rome La Sapienza, Rome, Italy), Floris Wouterlood (Vrije Universiteit Amsterdam, Amsterdam, Netherlands) and Dubravka Svob Strac (Ruđer Bošković Institute, Zagreb, Croatia)

Previous editors in Chief: Vincenzo Crunelli (Cardiff University, Cardiff, UK), Greg Gerhardt (University of Kentucky, Chandler Medical Centre, Lexington, Kentucky, USA), J.S. Kelly (Department of Pharmacology, University of Edinburgh, Edinburgh, UK) and N. Bowery (University of Birmingham, Birmingham, UK).

== Abstracting and indexing ==
The journal is abstracted and indexed in:

- Academic OneFile
- Academic Search
- Biological Abstracts
- BIOSIS Previews
- CAB Abstracts
- Chemical Abstracts
- Current Contents/Life Sciences
- Elsevier BIOBASE
- Embase
- FRANCIS
- Global Health
- Index Medicus/MEDLINE/PubMed
- Inspec
- PASCAL
- Science Citation Index
- Scopus
- Tropical Diseases Bulletin

According to the Journal Citation Reports (JCR), the journal has a 2018 impact factor of 2.785, ranking it 31st out of 79 journals in the category "Biochemical Research Methods" and 135th out of 267 journals in the category "Neurosciences".
