= MADAM =

Clinical data
- Other names: N,N-Dimethyl-2-(2-amino-4-methylphenylthio)benzylamine
- Drug class: Serotonin reuptake inhibitor
- ATC code: None

Identifiers
- IUPAC name: 2-[2-[(dimethylamino)methyl]phenyl]sulfanyl-5-methylaniline
- PubChem CID: 10084648
- ChEMBL: ChEMBL22183

Chemical and physical data
- Formula: C_{16}H_{20}N_{2}S
- Molar mass: 272.41 g·mol^{−1}
- 3D model (JSmol): Interactive image
- SMILES: CC1=CC(=C(C=C1)SC2=CC=CC=C2CN(C)C)N
- InChI: InChI=1S/C16H20N2S/c1-12-8-9-16(14(17)10-12)19-15-7-5-4-6-13(15)11-18(2)3/h4-10H,11,17H2,1-3H3; Key:UABIXNSHHIMZEP-UHFFFAOYSA-N

MADAM, also known as N,N-dimethyl-2-(2-amino-4-methylphenylthio)benzylamine, is a highly potent and selective serotonin reuptake inhibitor (SRI) which is used in scientific research. Its affinity (K_{d}) for the serotonin transporter (SERT) is 60 pM (0.06 nM). Radiolabeled isotopologues of MADAM have been developed and used as radiotracers in positron emission tomography (PET) imaging. The drug was first described in the scientific literature by 2001.
