= Acta Neurologica Scandinavica =

- Discipline: Neuroscience
- Language: English
- Edited by: Elinor Ben-Menachem

Publication details
- History: 1925–present
- Publisher: Wiley-Blackwell (United Kingdom)
- Frequency: monthly
- Impact factor: 3.915 (2021)

Standard abbreviations
- ISO 4: Acta Neurol. Scand.

Indexing
- ISSN: 0001-6314 (print); 1600-0404 (web)
- OCLC no.: 183337241

Links
- Journal homepage; Online access

Acta Neurologica Scandinavica is a peer-reviewed medical journal specializing in neurology published by Wiley-Blackwell. The editor-in-chief is Elinor Ben-Menachem.

According to the Journal Citation Reports, the journal had a 2021 impact factor of 3.915.

== Abstracting and indexing ==
The journal is indexed in several bibliographic databases, including:

- Science Citation Index Expanded (Clarivate)
- EBSCO
- BIOSIS
- Embase

== See also ==
- List of medical journals
