= Serotonin transporter =

Mammalian protein found in humans

SLC6A4
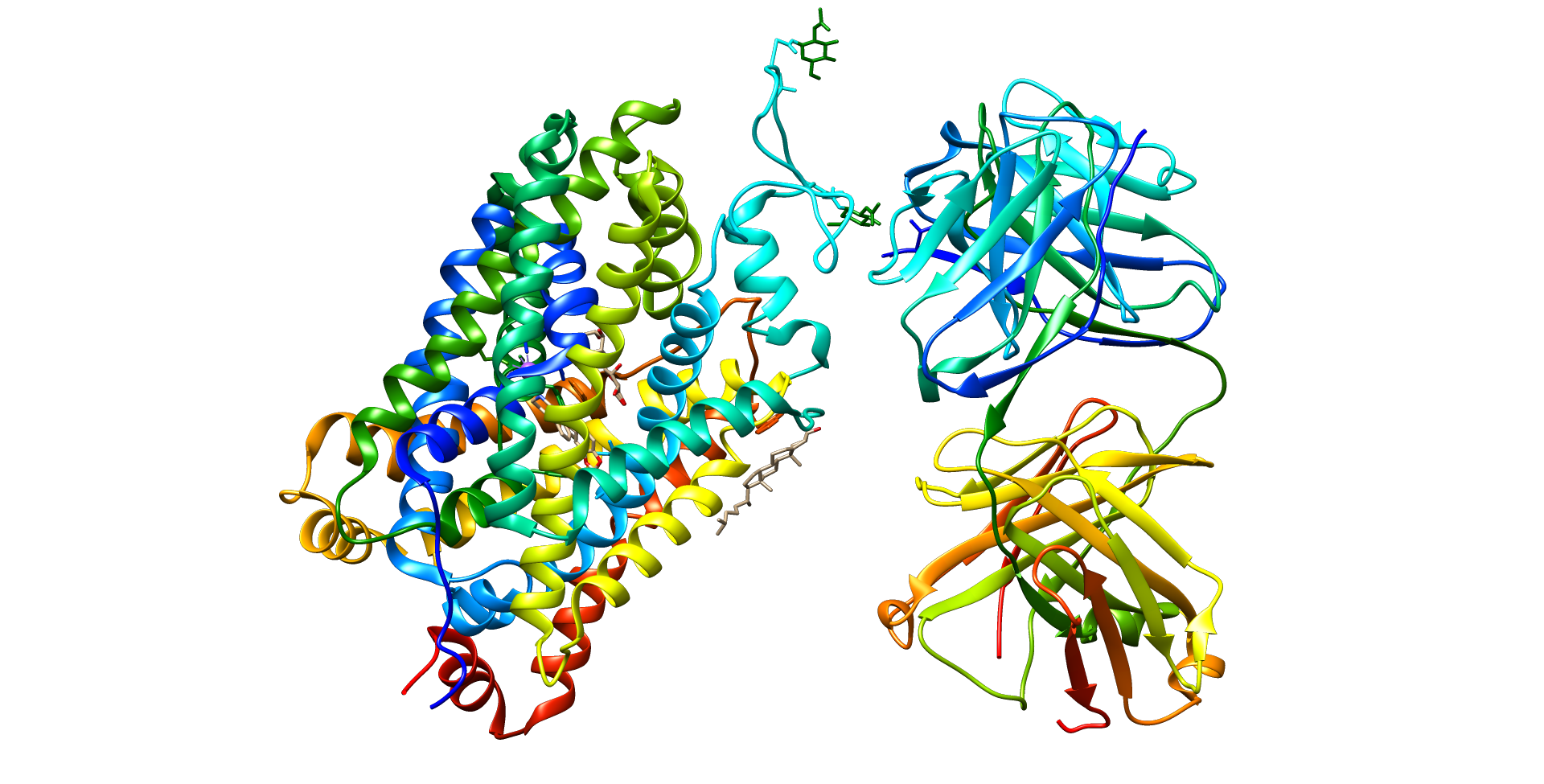

Identifiers
- Aliases: SLC6A4, 5-HTT, 5HTT, HTT, OCD1, SERT, SERT1, hSERT, Solute Carrier Family 6 (neurotransmitter transporter), member 4, solute carrier family 6 member 4, 5-HTTLPR
- External IDs: OMIM: 182138; MGI: 96285; GeneCards: SLC6A4
Available structures
PDB	Ortholog search: PDBe RCSB
PDB	List of PDB id codes 5I6X, 5I73, 5I75, 5I6Z, 5I71, 5I74

Gene location (Human)
Chr.	Chromosome 17 (human)
Band	17q11.2	Start	30,194,319 bp
Band	17q11.2	End	30,236,002 bp

Gene location (Mouse)
Chr.	Chromosome 11 (mouse)
Band	11 B5|11 46.18 cM	Start	76,889,429 bp
Band	11 B5|11 46.18 cM	End	76,923,166 bp
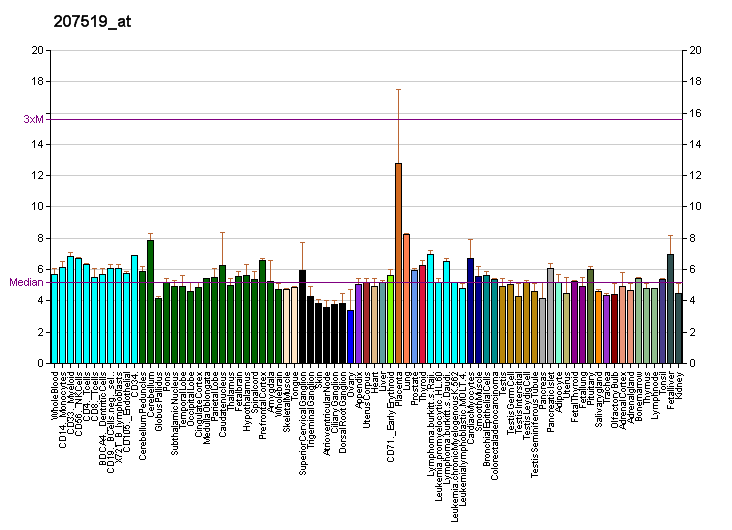
RNA expression pattern
Bgee	Human / Mouse (ortholog); Top expressed in: right lung; jejunal mucosa; mucosa of ileum; lower lobe of lung; placenta; upper lobe of left lung; duodenum; buccal mucosa cell; superior vestibular nucleus; oral cavity / Top expressed in: central gray substance of midbrain; dorsal tegmental nucleus; blood; jejunum; yolk sac; duodenum; set of raphe nuclei of tegmentum of midbrain; adrenal gland; intestinal villus; Ileal epithelium; More reference expression data
BioGPS	More reference expression data
Gene ontology
Molecular function	cocaine binding; nitric-oxide synthase binding; protein homodimerization activity; myosin binding; syntaxin-1 binding; metal ion binding; neurotransmitter:sodium symporter activity; actin filament binding; monoamine transmembrane transporter activity; protein binding; symporter activity; serotonin:sodium symporter activity; dopamine:sodium symporter activity; serotonin binding
Cellular component	integral component of membrane; cytosol; endosome; membrane; integral component of plasma membrane; membrane raft; neuron projection; endosome membrane; endomembrane system; presynapse; plasma membrane; integral component of postsynaptic membrane; integral component of presynaptic membrane; serotonergic synapse; focal adhesion; synapse
Biological process	cellular response to organic substance; cellular response to retinoic acid; response to estradiol; cellular response to cGMP; response to hypoxia; negative regulation of neuron differentiation; ejaculation; response to nutrient; vasoconstriction; negative regulation of cerebellar granule cell precursor proliferation; memory; monoamine transport; response to organic substance; brain development; positive regulation of gene expression; positive regulation of cell cycle; serotonin transport; protein complex oligomerization; circadian rhythm; transmembrane transport; social behavior; serotonin uptake; neurotransmitter transport; negative regulation of organ growth; protein homooligomerization; response to toxic substance; negative regulation of synaptic transmission, dopaminergic; brain morphogenesis; positive regulation of serotonin secretion; neurotransmitter biosynthetic process; dopamine uptake involved in synaptic transmission; regulation of thalamus size
Sources:Amigo / QuickGO
Orthologs
Databases	NCBI: entry; OMA: entry
Species	Human	Mouse
Entrez	6532	15567
Ensembl	ENSG00000108576	ENSMUSG00000020838
UniProt	P31645	Q60857
RefSeq (mRNA)	NM_001045	NM_010484
RefSeq (protein)	NP_001036	NP_034614
Location (UCSC)	Chr 17: 30.19 – 30.24 Mb	Chr 11: 76.89 – 76.92 Mb
PubMed search
- Wikidata
View/Edit Human	View/Edit Mouse

The serotonin transporter (SERT or 5-HTT), also known as the sodium-dependent serotonin transporter and solute carrier family 6 member 4, is a protein that in humans is encoded by the SLC6A4 gene. SERT is a type of monoamine transporter protein that transports the neurotransmitter serotonin from the synaptic cleft back to the presynaptic neuron, in a process known as serotonin reuptake.

This transport of serotonin by the SERT protein terminates the action of serotonin and recycles it in a sodium-dependent manner. Many antidepressant medications of the SSRI and tricyclic antidepressant classes work by binding to SERT and thus reducing serotonin reuptake. It is a member of the sodium:neurotransmitter symporter family. A repeat length polymorphism in the promoter of this gene has been shown to affect the rate of serotonin uptake and may play a role in sudden infant death syndrome, aggressive behavior in Alzheimer's disease patients, post-traumatic stress disorder and depression-susceptibility in people experiencing emotional trauma.

== Mechanism of action ==
Serotonin-reuptake transporters are dependent on both the concentration of potassium ion in the cytoplasm and the concentrations of sodium and chloride ions in the extracellular fluid. In order to function properly the serotonin transporter requires the membrane potential created by the sodium-potassium adenosine triphosphatase.

The serotonin transporter first binds a sodium ion, followed by the serotonin, and then a chloride ion; it is then allowed, thanks to the membrane potential, to flip inside the cell freeing all the elements previously bound. Right after the release of the serotonin in the cytoplasm a potassium ion binds to the transporter which is now able to flip back out returning to its active state.

== Function ==
The serotonin transporter removes serotonin from the synaptic cleft back into the synaptic boutons. Thus, it terminates the effects of serotonin and simultaneously enables its reuse by the presynaptic neuron.

Neurons communicate by using chemical messengers like serotonin between cells. The transporter protein, by recycling serotonin, regulates its concentration in a gap, or synapse, and thus its effects on a receiving neuron's receptors.

Medical studies have shown that changes in serotonin transporter metabolism appear to be associated with many different phenomena, including alcoholism, clinical depression, obsessive–compulsive disorder (OCD), romantic love, hypertension and generalized social phobia.

The serotonin transporter is also present in platelets; there, serotonin functions as a vasoconstrictive substance. It also serves as a signalling molecule to induce platelet aggregation.

Serotonin

== Pharmacology ==
In 1995 and 1996, scientists in Europe had identified the polymorphism 5-HTTLPR, a serotonin-transporter in the gene SLC6A4. In December 1996, a group of researchers led by D. A. Collier of the Institute of Psychiatry, Psychology and Neuroscience, published their findings in Molecular Psychiatry that "5-HTTLPR-dependent variation in functional 5-HTT expression is a potential genetic susceptibility factor for affective disorders."

SERT spans the plasma membrane 12 times. It belongs to the NE, DA, SERT monoamine transporter family. Transporters are important sites for agents that treat psychiatric disorders. Drugs that reduce the binding of serotonin to transporters (serotonin reuptake inhibitors, or SRIs) are used to treat mental disorders. The selective serotonin reuptake inhibitor (SSRI) fluoxetine and the tricyclic antidepressant (TCA) clomipramine are examples of serotonin reuptake inhibitors.

Following the elucidation of structures of the homologous bacterial transporter, LeuT, co-crystallized with tricyclic antidepressants in the vestibule leading from the extracellular space to the central substrate site it was inferred that this binding site did also represent the binding site relevant for antidepressant binding in SERT. However, studies on SERT showed that tricyclic antidepressants and selective serotonin reuptake inhibitors bind to the central binding site overlapping the substrate binding site. The Drosophila dopamine transporter, which displays a pharmacology similar to SERT, was crystallized with tricyclic antidepressants and confirmed the earlier finding that the substrate binding site is also the antidepressant binding site.

12a

4b

=== Ligands ===
- DASB
- compound 4b: Ki = 17 pM; 710-fold and 11,100-fold selective over DAT and NET
- compound (+)-12a: Ki = 180 pM at hSERT; >1000-fold selective over hDAT, hNET, 5-HT_{1A}, and 5-HT_{6}. Isosteres
- 3-cis-(3-Aminocyclopentyl)indole 8a: Ki = 220 pM
- allosteric modulator: 3′-Methoxy-8-methyl-spiro{8-azabicyclo[3.2.1]octane-3,5′(4′H)-isoxazole} (compound 7a)
- allosteric modulator: p-Trifluoromethyl-methcathinone

== Genetics ==
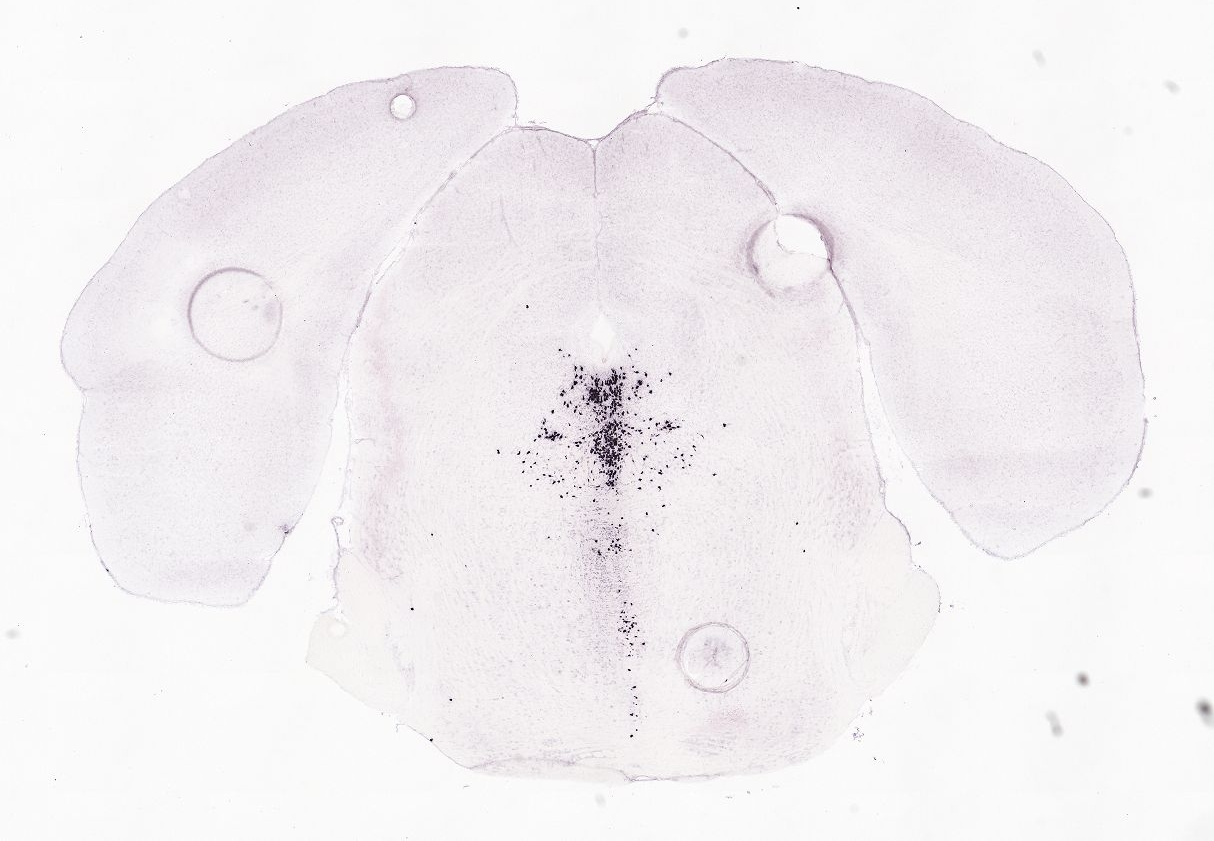
Slc6a4 is expressed in median and dorsal raphe in the midbrain of the postnatal day 56 mouse. Allen Brain Atlases

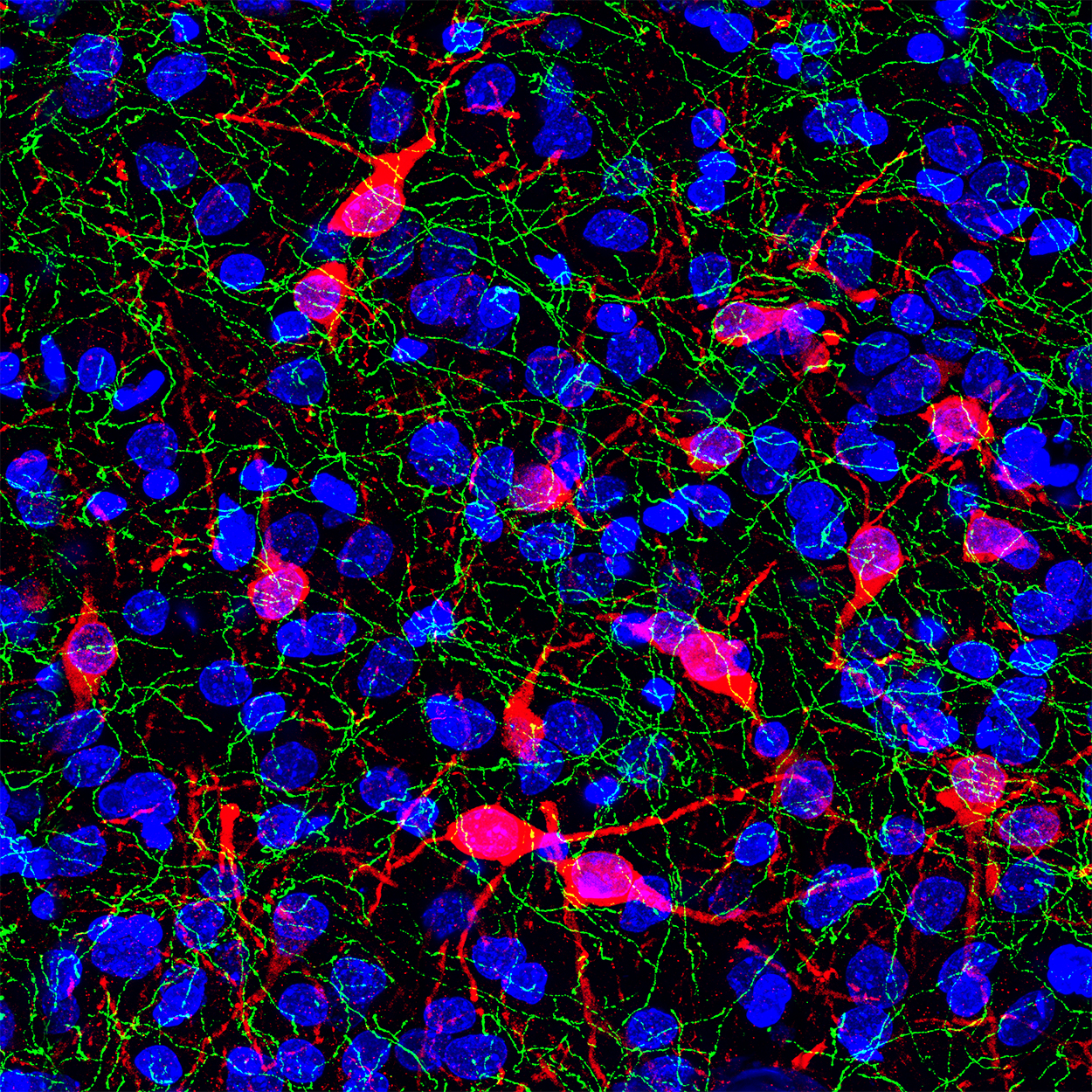
Serotonin transporter 1 (Slc6a4) in green, tyrosine hydroxylase in red and nuclear DNA in blue in a region of rat brain stem. Antibody staining and imaging by EnCor Biotechnology Inc.

Chromosome 17

The gene that encodes the serotonin transporter is called solute carrier family 6 (neurotransmitter transporter, serotonin), member 4 (SLC6A4, see Solute carrier family). In humans the gene is found on chromosome 17 on location 17q11.1–q12.

Mutations associated with the gene may result in changes in serotonin transporter function, and experiments with mice have identified more than 50 different phenotypic changes as a result of genetic variation. These phenotypic changes may, e.g., be increased anxiety and gut dysfunction. Some of the human genetic variations associated with the gene are:

- Length variation in the serotonin-transporter-gene-linked polymorphic region (5-HTTLPR)
- rs25531 — a single nucleotide polymorphism (SNP) in the 5-HTTLPR
- rs25532 — another SNP in the 5-HTTLPR
- STin2 — a variable number of tandem repeats (VNTR) in the functional intron 2
- G56A on the second exon
- I425V on the ninth exon

=== Length variation in 5-HTTLPR ===
According to a 1996 article in The Journal of Neurochemistry, the promoter region of the SLC6A4 gene contains a polymorphism with "short" and "long" repeats in a region: 5-HTT-linked polymorphic region (5-HTTLPR or SERTPR). The short variation has 14 repeats of a sequence while the long variation has 16 repeats. A second 1996 article stated that the short variation leads to less transcription for SLC6A4, and it has been found that it can partly account for anxiety-related personality traits. This polymorphism has been extensively investigated in over 300 scientific studies (as of 2006). The 5-HTTLPR polymorphism may be subdivided further: One study published in 2000 found 14 allelic variants (14-A, 14-B, 14-C, 14-D, 15, 16-A, 16-B, 16-C, 16-D, 16-E, 16-F, 19, 20 and 22) in a group of around 200 Japanese and Caucasian people.

In addition to altering the expression of SERT protein and concentrations of extracellular serotonin in the brain, the 5-HTTLPR variation is associated with changes in brain structure. One 2005 study found less grey matter in perigenual anterior cingulate cortex and amygdala for short allele carriers of the 5-HTTLPR polymorphism compared to subjects with the long/long genotype.

In contrast, a 2008 meta-analysis found no significant overall association between the 5-HTTLPR polymorphism and autism. A hypothesized gene–environment interaction between the short/short allele of the 5-HTTLPR and life stress as predictor for major depression has suffered a similar fate: after an influential initial report in 2003 there were mixed results in replication in 2008, and a 2009 meta-analysis was negative. See 5-HTTLPR for more information.

=== rs25532 ===
rs25532 is a SNP (C>T) close to the site of 5-HTTLPR. It has been examined in connection with obsessive compulsive disorder (OCD).

=== I425V ===
I425V is a rare mutation on the ninth exon. In 2003, researchers from Japan and the US reported that they had found this genetic variation in unrelated families with OCD, and have found that it leads to faulty transporter function and regulation. A second variant in the same gene of some patients with this mutation suggests a genetic "double hit", resulting in greater biochemical effects and more severe symptoms.

=== VNTR in STin2 ===
Another noncoding polymorphism is a VNTR in the second intron (STin2). In a 2005 study, it was found with three alleles: 9, 10 and 12 repeats. A meta-analysis has found that the 12 repeat allele of the STin2 VNTR polymorphism had some minor (with odds ratio 1.24), but statistically significant, association with schizophrenia. A 2008 meta-analysis found no significant overall association between the STin2 VNTR polymorphism and autism. Furthermore, a 2003 meta-analysis of affective disorders, major depressive disorder and bipolar disorder, found a minor association to the intron 2 VNTR polymorphism, but the results of the meta-analysis were dependent upon a large effect from one individual study.

The polymorphism has also been related to personality traits with a 2008 Russian study finding individuals with the STin2.10 allele having lower neuroticism scores as measured with the Eysenck Personality Inventory.

== Neuroimaging ==
The distribution of the serotonin transporter in the brain may be imaged with positron emission tomography using radioligands called DASB and DAPP; the first such studies on the human brain were reported in 2000. DASB and DAPP are not the only radioligands for the serotonin transporter. There are numerous others, with the most popular probably being the β-CIT radioligand with an iodine-123 isotope that is used for brain scanning with single-photon emission computed tomography (SPECT) according to a 1993 article in the Journal of Neural Transmission. The radioligands were used in 2006 to examine whether variables such as age, gender or genotype are associated with differential serotonin transporter binding. Healthy subjects that have a high score of neuroticism—a personality trait in the Revised NEO Personality Inventory—were found to have more serotonin transporter binding in the thalamus in 2007.

== Neuroimaging and genetics ==
Studies on the serotonin transporter have combined neuroimaging and genetics methods, e.g., a voxel-based morphometry study found less grey matter in perigenual anterior cingulate cortex and amygdala for short allele carriers of the 5-HTTLPR polymorphism compared to subjects with the long/long genotype.
