= Binding potential =

In pharmacokinetics and receptor–ligand kinetics the binding potential (BP) is a combined measure of the density of "available" neuroreceptors and the affinity of a drug to that neuroreceptor.

== Description ==
Consider a ligand receptor binding system. Ligand with a concentration L associates with a receptor of concentration or availability R to form a ligand-receptor complex with concentration RL. The binding potential is then the ratio ligand-receptor complex to free ligand at equilibrium and in the limit of L tending to 0, and is given symbol BP:

$BP=\frac{RL}{L}\bigg|_{L\approx0}$

This quantity, originally defined by Mintun, describes the capacity of a receptor to bind ligand. It is a limit (L << Ki) of the general receptor association equation:

$RL=\frac{R*L}{L+Ki}$

and is thus also equivalent to:

$BP=\frac{R}{K_i}$

These equations apply equally when measuring the total receptor density or the residual receptor density available after binding to second ligand - availability.

== BP in Positron Emission Tomography ==
BP is a pivotal measure in the use of positron emission tomography (PET) to measure the density of "available" receptors, e.g. to assess the occupancy by drugs or to characterize neuropsychiatric diseases (yet, one should keep in mind that binding potential is a combined measure that depends on receptor density as well as on affinity). An overview of the related methodology is e.g. given in Laruelle et al. (2002). Estimating BP with PET usually requires that a reference tissue is available. A reference tissue has negligible receptor density and its distribution volume should be the same as the distribution volume in the target region if all receptors were blocked. Although the BP can be measured in a relatively unbiased way by measuring the whole time course of labelled ligand association and blood radioactivity, this is practically not always necessary. Two other common measures have been derived, which involve assumptions, but result in measures that should correlate with BP: $BP_1$ and $BP_2$.

- $BP_2$: The "specific to nonspecific equilibrium partition coefficient", in the literature also denoted as $V_3''$. This is the ratio of specifically bound to nondisplaceable tracer in brain tissue at true equilibrium. It can be calculated without arterial blood sampling. In the two-tissue compartment model: $BP_2=k_3/k_4$ and $BP_2=f_2BP$ where $f_2$ is the free fraction of the tracer in the first tissue compartment, i.e. a measure that depends on the nonspecific binding of the ligand in brain tissue
- $BP_1$: The ratio of specifically bound tracer to tracer in plasma at true equilibrium, in the literature also denoted $BP'$. Measuring $BP_1$ includes measurements of radioactivity in plasma, including metabolite correction. From the two-tissue compartment model and by assuming there is only passive diffusion across the blood brain barrier, one obtains: $BP_1=f_1BP$ where $f_1$ is the free fraction of the tracer in arterial plasma, i.e. a measure that depends on plasma binding. Measuring and dividing by $f_1$ finally allows to obtain BP.

== Definitions and Symbols ==
While $BP_1$ and $BP_2$ are nonambiguous symbols, BP is not. There are many publications in which BP denotes $BP_2$. Generally, if there were no arterial samples ("noninvasive imaging"), BP denotes $BP_2$.

$B_{max}$: Total density of receptors = $R+RL$. In PET imaging, the amount of radioligand is usually very small (L << Ki, see above), thus $B_{max} \approx R$

$k_3$ and $k_4$: Transfer rate constants from the two tissue compartment model.

NEW NOTATIONAL CONVENTIONS: In Innis et al., a large group of researchers who are active in this field agreed to a consensus nomenclature for these terms, with the intent of making the literature in this field more transparent to non-specialists. The convention involves use of the subscripts p for quantities referred to plasma and ND for quantities referred to the free plus nonspecifically bound concentration in brain (NonDisplaceable). Under the consensus nomenclature, the parameters referred to above as f_{1} and BP_{1} are now called f_{p} and BP_{p}, while f_{2} and BP_{2} are called f_{ND} and BP_{ND}.

== See also ==
- Volume of distribution
