= Gitte Moos Knudsen =

Danish neurologist

- Born: 15 February 1959; Lyngby, Denmark
- Education: University of Copenhagen, Rigshospitalet, NIH, MGH
- Known for: neurobiology of neurotransmission, with particular emphasis on molecular brain imaging
- Medical career
- Profession: Neurologist
- Institutions: University of Copenhagen; CIMBI,
- Sub-specialties: brain imaging Neurotransmitters
- Research: neurotransmission, particularly serotonin
- Awards: Niels Lassen Prize; Synthelabo RechercheAward; Monrad-Krohn Prize for the Advancement of Neurological Research

Gitte Moos Knudsen (legal name Karen Birgitte Moos Knudsen) is a Danish translational neurobiologist and clinical neurologist, and Clinical Professor and Chief Physician at the Department of Clinical Medicine, Neurology, Psychiatry and Sensory Sciences, at Copenhagen University Hospital. She graduated from Lyngby Statsskole, just north of Copenhagen, before gaining entrance to medicine, where she received her MD from University of Copenhagen in 1984, and became a Board certified user of radioisotopes in 1986. She sat the FMGEMS exam (Foreign Medical Graduates Examination in the Medical Sciences) (US) in 1989. She became Board certified in neurology in 1994 and received her DMSc (Dr.Med.) from University of Copenhagen in 1994. She currently resides in Copenhagen, and is married to Tore Vulpius. She has 3 children.

== Career ==
Knudsen is one of the leading figures in the neurosciences, assisting various European Union nations to prioritize research and grants. In addition, her research into the brain and its chemistry during depression, Alzheimer's disease, and states induced by drugs such as GHB and ecstasy (MDMA) is at the forefront of world knowledge, and she is a noted scholar in these areas, publishing many papers on each topic. Her interest in brain imaging has led to a deeper understanding of how many receptors act within the brain, and she has produced studies using SPECT, PET, and MRI results to interpret these. A key issue is that the latest brain research not only contributes to increased understanding of brain functions, but is also used to attempt to explain what it means to be human.

=== CIMBI ===
The Lundbeck Foundation, created in 1954, donated one of the largest amounts ever given toward the development of medical knowledge, listing a total of DKK 504 million to various institutions in 2011. With a 40 million grant from this program, Knudsen, together with a team of researchers from the Center for Integrated Molecular Imaging of the Brain (CIMBI), University of Copenhagen, are concentrating on investigating the neural bases of personality that predispose individuals to various disorders, using PET and MRI technology. She is currently the Center Director of The Lundbeck Foundation Centre for Integrated Molecular Brain Imaging (CIMBI).

=== Research focus ===
Regarding her research, Knudsen states:

I am a translational neurobiologist and clinical neurologist with interest in advanced methodological developments that I subsequently apply in my research to address pertinent neurobiological and clinical issues. My scientific interests have fallen in three sequentially separated categories:

- (i) blood–brain barrier transport – which was the basis for my DMSc thesis (1985–1992),
- (ii) neurobiology of cerebral blood flow and metabolism (1992–2000) and
- (iii) neurobiology of the neurotransmission with particular emphasis on molecular brain imaging (1998– current). CIMBI focuses on the neural bases of personality dimensions that predispose individuals to e.g., affective and substance use disorders, with special emphasis on the serotonergic neurotransmitter system.

=== Awards ===
- Member of the Royal Danish Academy of Sciences and Letters since 2004.
- Prize 1994 of the Société de Circulation et Métabolism du Cerveau, France;
- Anne Bochardt Prize 1999 awarded by the Medical Society in Copenhagen;
- William Ottesen & Wife’s Foundation 2008, Denmark;
- Monrad-Krohn Prize for the Advancement of Neurological Research 2010, Norway;
- Niels Lassen Prize 2011, Denmark

=== Previous appointments ===
- Visiting scientist at NIH and at Stony Brook, United States (1985–90),
- Visiting scientist at Institute of Physiology, Bonn, Germany (1988–89)
- Visiting scientist at MGH Harvard, Boston (2011–12).
- Clinical education has predominantly taken place at Rigshospitalet and has been interspersed by a three years appointment as research fellow (1986–1989) at the Dept. of Neurology, and by maternal leave in 1989, 1992, and 1995.
- Appointed as research professor in Neurobiology and Chief Neurologist at University of Copenhagen in 1999.
- Professor of Neurology at University of Copenhagen 2005–2006 and of Neurobiology from 2004.

=== Present appointments ===
- Chief neurologist at Dept Neurology, Rigshospitalet and
- Chairperson at the Neurobiology ResearchUnit, Rigshospitalet, and
- Director of the Lundbeck Foundation Center for Integrated Molecular Brain Imaging (CIMBI).
- Professor in Clinical Neurobiology at the University of Copenhagen.

=== Positions of trust and research assessments ===
- Past-President and member of the Executive Committee of the European College of Neuropsychopharmacology.
- Member of the Board of Directors 1995–1999 and Scientific Secretary 2001–2005 of the International Society of Cerebral Blood Flow and Metabolism;
- Member of the Danish Society for Neuroscience from 1997
- President 2010–) of the Scientific Ethics Committee for Copenhagen and Frederiksberg 1998–2002;
- President of the Research Council of the Medical Faculty at the University of Copenhagen from 1999–2005;
- Chairman for the steering group for research laboratories at Rigshospitalet from 1999, Scientific Advisory Board Member, Health Science Faculty, University of Lund 2007–10.
- Examiner at PhD and DMSc theses in Denmark, Canada, Sweden, Australia, and Finland.
- Member of EU’s Fifth Framework Expert Panel for evaluation of research applications, Brussels, in 1999, 2000, and 2005
- Member of EU’s Fifth Framework Expert Panel for evaluation of research applications for the Norwegian Research Council 2006-7,
- Member of EU’s Fifth Framework Expert Panel for evaluation of research applications for Danish Multiple Sclerosis Foundation Research Committee 2007-9,
- Member of EU’s Fifth Framework Expert Panel for evaluation of research applications for the Swedish Research Council and VINNOVA 2005–2008.
- Member of the Danish Health Advisory Group for the EU 7th Framework Program 2009–.
- Member of the program committee of the Danish Council for Strategic Research 2009–.
- Executive Committee of European College of Neuropsychopharmacology 2010–.
- Editorial Board member on Journals Cerebral Bloodflow and Metabolism, CurrentRadiopharmaceuticals, Membrane Transport and Signaling and Biology of Mood and Anxiety Disorders.
- Faculty member at international courses for postgraduates and invited speaker at international meetings about 10 times yearly.

=== Leadership ===
- Leader of Neurobiology Research Unit (NRU) at Rigshospitalet since 2004 (www.nru.dk). NRU encompasses around 50 staff members, publishes around 35 peer-reviewed papers per year and has an annual budget of roughly 5 mio $ or 3.5 mio €.
- Director of the Lundbeck Foundation Center for Integrated Molecular Brain Imaging (Cimbi) since 2006; based on an 11 mio € grant donation from the Lundbeck Foundation to establish a neuroscience center (www.cimbi.org).

=== International relations ===
- European collaborations within the EUREKA Program (1998–2000); the COST EU Program (1999–2000). Coordinator of EU Fifth Framework program on “Neuroreceptor mapping in patients with mild cognitive impairment”, 2001-6. Partner within the EU 6th and 7th Framework programs DiMI (2005–10), Euripides (2007–12), and InMind (2012–).
- Partner in the European multicentre database of healthy controls for [123I]FP-CIT SPECT (ENCDAT) since 2005 and partner in METPETS (Measuring Endogenous Neurotransmitters by PET and SPECT).
- Affiliated partner in the International Consortium for Brain Mapping.
- Visiting professor at the Martinos Center, Massachusetts General Hospital and Harvard University, Boston, USA, 2011–12 (7 months research leave). Several joint research projects were established during that period, with exchange of PhD-students and senior scientists from both sides, and so far two joint funding grants.

== Selected publications ==
=== First-author articles ===
- Knudsen, Gitte; Poulsen HE; Paulson, Olaf Bjarne (1988). "Blood-brain barrier permeability in galactosamine-induced hepatic encephalopathy. No evidence for increased GABA-transport". Journal of Hepatology. 6 (2): 187–192. doi:10.1016/s0168-8278(88)80030-8. PMID 3411098. Wikidata Q41440975.
- Knudsen, Gitte; Pettigrew KD; Paulson, Olaf Bjarne; Hertz MM; Patlak CS (1990). "Kinetic analysis of blood-brain barrier transport of D-glucose in man: quantitative evaluation in the presence of tracer backflux and capillary heterogeneity". Microvascular Research. 39 (1): 28–49. doi:10.1016/0026-2862(90)90057-x. PMID 2314306. Wikidata Q51655780.
- Knudsen, Gitte M; Jensen, Peter S; Erritzoe, David; et al. (2016). "The Center for Integrated Molecular Brain Imaging (Cimbi) database" (PDF). NeuroImage. 124 (Part B): 1213–1219. doi:10.1016/j.neuroimage.2015.04.025. OCLC 936131028. PMID 25891375. Wikidata Q22329404.
- Knudsen, Gitte; Schmidt J; Almdal T; Paulson, Olaf Bjarne; Vilstrup, Hendrik (1993). "Passage of amino acids and glucose across the blood-brain barrier in patients with hepatic encephalopathy". Hepatology. 17 (6): 987–992. doi:10.1016/0270-9139(93)90111-y. PMID 8514271. Wikidata Q48269278.

=== Other articles ===
- Robert B Innis; Cunningham, Vincent; Jacques Delforge; et al. (2007). "Consensus nomenclature for in vivo imaging of reversibly binding radioligands". Journal of Cerebral Blood Flow & Metabolism. 27 (9): 1533–1539. doi:10.1038/sj.jcbfm.9600493. PMID 17519979. Wikidata Q34630958.
- Klein, Anders; Rebecca Williamson; Martin A Santini; Clemmensen, Christoffer; Anders Ettrup; Maribel Rios; Knudsen, Gitte; Aznar, Susana (2010). "Blood BDNF concentrations reflect brain-tissue BDNF levels across species". The International Journal of Neuropsychopharmacology. 14 (3): 347–353. doi:10.1017/s1461145710000738. PMID 20604989. Wikidata Q48138873.
- Svarer, Claus; Madsen, Kathrine; Hasselbalch, Steen; et al. (2004). "MR-based automatic delineation of volumes of interest in human brain PET images using probability maps". NeuroImage. 24 (4): 969–979. doi:10.1016/j.neuroimage.2004.10.017. PMID 15670674. Wikidata Q41798898.
- Frokjaer, Vibe G; Mortensen, Erik L; Nielsen, Finn A; et al. (2008). "Frontolimbic serotonin 2A receptor binding in healthy subjects is associated with personality risk factors for affective disorder". Biological Psychiatry. 63 (6): 569–576. doi:10.1016/j.biopsych.2007.07.009. PMID 17884017. Wikidata Q20984691.
