= Sveinsdóttir =

Sveinsdóttir is an Icelandic feminine patronymic, meaning daughter of Sveinn. In Icelandic names, a patronymic is not a surname. Notable people with this name include:

- Anna María Sveinsdóttir (born 1969), Icelandic basketball player
- Ásta Kristjana Sveinsdóttir (born 1969), Icelandic philosopher
- Auður Sveinsdóttir Laxness (1918–2012), Icelandic writer and craftswoman
- Edda Sveinsdottir (1936–2022), Icelandic/Danish computer scientist
- Gunnhildr Sveinsdóttir (died c. 1050), Queen consort or consorts of Sweden and Denmark
- Herdís Sveinsdóttir (born 1956), Icelandic professor of nursing
- Jóhanna Björk Sveinsdóttir (born 1989), Icelandic basketball player
- Júlíana Sveinsdóttir (1889–1966), Icelandic painter and textile artist
- Lára Sveinsdóttir (born 1955), Icelandic track and field athlete
- Steinunn Sveinsdóttir (1767–1805), Icelandic murderer
- Þorbjörg Sveinsdóttir (1827–1903), Icelandic midwife and feminist

== See also ==
- Sveinsdóttir (crater), named after Júlíana Sveinsdóttir
- Sveinsson, the equivalent masculine patronymic
