= Patrick Lyden =

American neurologist, academic and author

Patrick D. Lyden
- Born: United States
- Title: Professor of Physiology and Neuroscience

Academic background
- Education: B.S., Biochemistry; M.D., Medicine
- Alma mater: University of California, Los Angeles; Medicine, Baylor College of Medicine

Academic work
- Institutions: USC-Keck School of Medicine

Patrick D. Lyden is an American neurologist, academic and an author. He is the Professor of Physiology and Neuroscience and Professor of Neurology at the USC-Keck School of Medicine.

Most known for his contributions to stroke research, Lyden holds two patents for his inventions and has led large-scale, multinational trials. He co-led with 7 other investigators the NINDS t-PA for Acute Stroke Trial, which established the first validated therapy for stroke. His authored works include articles published in academic journals, including New England Journal of Medicine, Science Translational Medicine and Annals of Neurology. He was awarded the 2024 Neurologist Pioneer Award of the Society for Vascular Neurology and Intervention, and the 2019 William M. Feinberg Award for Excellence in Clinical Stroke by the American Heart Association.

== Education and early career ==
Lyden earned his Bachelor of Science in Biochemistry from the University of California in 1978. Later in 1981, he completed his Doctor of Medicine degree at Baylor College of Medicine.

== Career ==
Lyden began his academic career in 1987 at the University of California, San Diego, where he held the position of Assistant Professor in Residence in the Department of Neurosciences from 1987 to 1993. He was promoted to Associate Professor in Residence from 1993 to 1999. From 1994 to 2009, he served as Professor in the Department of Neurosciences. From 2010 to 2021, he was Professor in Residence in the Department of Neurology at the University of California, Los Angeles. Between 2020 and 2021, he was a visiting professor at the USC-Keck School of Medicine. Since 2021, he has been a Full Professor at the USC-Keck School of Medicine.

From 1996 to 2009, he served as Chief of Neurology at the University of California, San Diego. Between 1998 and 2009, he also served as Director of the Stroke Center and Vice Chair of Neurosciences for Adult Clinical Neurology. He was Chief of the Stroke Clinic from 1991 to 2009. Between 2010 and 2018, he was Founding Director of the Comprehensive Stroke Center and Founding Chair of the Department of Neurology at Cedars-Sinai Medical Center. He also held the position of Carmen and Louis Warschaw Chair in Neurology at Cedars-Sinai Medical Center from 2010 to 2020. He also served as the Chair of the Stroke Council of the American Heart Association between 2021 and 2023.

== Works ==
Lyden is known for his work on the National Institutes of Health Stroke Scale or NIHSS. He wrote and directed training videos to train and certify users to correctly use the scale, for which he shared with the NIH a prestigious Cine Golden Eagle award from the Council on International Non-Theatrical Events in 2007.

== Research ==
Lyden's research has explored both pre-clinical and clinical dimensions of thrombolysis in acute ischemic stroke. He developed a post-embolic hemorrhage model, leading to three significant conclusions: first, heparin anticoagulation did not markedly exacerbate hemorrhage following transformation; second, streptokinase, unlike rt-PA, was associated with promoting transformation; and third, tenecteplase emerged as a potent and potentially superior alternative to rt-PA. Subsequently, he was appointed as the San Diego Principal Investigator for the NINDS rt-PA Acute Stroke Trial. Along with investigators from six other sites, he contributed to drafting the trial protocol and reporting the main outcomes. Additionally, he authored, directed and produced the NIH Stroke Scale training and certification video, managed the clinimetric validation of these video tools, and served as the principal author of a critical subgroup analysis of the trial's primary findings.

Focusing his research on GABA agonists and their role in neuroprotection, Lyden developed a quantal bioassay model and demonstrated that GABA-A receptor agonists were at least as effective in vivo as antagonists targeting glutamate channels. His findings further revealed that combining these two drug classes resulted in significant synergistic effects. He defined true pharmacological synergy as a combined treatment outcome that could not be achieved through simple dose increases of either drug alone. He served as the global principal investigator for the CLASS trial investigating the GABA-A agonist clomethiazole, the global principal investigator for the CHANT trial, and the North American coordinating investigator for SAINT 1 and SAINT 2.

In his investigations into vascular leakage and angiogenesis, Lyden developed a straightforward method for labeling blood-brain barrier (BBB) leakage. By utilizing FITC-dextran leakage, his research team delineated an area of irreversible necrosis, referred to as the "core" of the infarct. In related research, he identified that ischemic brain tissue generates angiogenic growth factors, which facilitate the opening of capillaries and the infiltration of phagocytic macrophages. This phenomenon was described as the "Clean-up hypothesis". Moreover, his findings provided strong evidence that the angiogenesis observed around infarcts functions solely to facilitate the clearance of necrotic tissue and does not contribute to protective or restorative processes.

Lyden's research on thrombin toxicity revealed that thrombin activity directly contributes to neuronal death during stroke and that thrombin antagonists, such as argatroban, serve as potent neuroprotective agents. Further studies demonstrated that neurons under oxygen-glucose deprivation (OGD) stress release thrombin into the surrounding culture medium. This OGD-conditioned medium was found to induce astrocyte activation, which could also be triggered by low thrombin concentrations. However, it was also established that this activation was prevented by thrombin inhibitors or by eliminating PAR-1 expression in astrocytes through knockdown or knockout methods. To advance this work, he collaboratively developed an inducible prothrombin knockout model specifically targeting neurons. In this model, neuronal prothrombin knockout resulted in a significant enlargement of the infarct region following middle cerebral artery occlusion (MCAo), alongside a marked reduction in astrocyte activation within the ischemic area.

Lyden and his research team also demonstrated that hypothermia affects astrocytes in a temperature-dependent and graded manner. They further discovered that rapidly lowering the temperature to 33 °C for a brief period was more effective in the MCAo model than prolonged cooling durations. Building on this work, they investigated the varied responses of different elements of the neurovascular unit to substrate deprivation, coining the term "differential vulnerability" for this phenomenon. Subsequently, his team explored various therapeutic agents for their selective effects on different cell types based on this principle. Their findings supported their hypothesis, showing that certain agents could protect one type of cell while mitigating harm to another. Through collaborative research, he confirmed the concept of differential vulnerability through genomic and pharmacological studies, demonstrating consistent evidence of this phenomenon in vivo.

Lyden also led the first comprehensive revision of the STAIR guidelines for preclinical evaluation of potential stroke therapies and introduced the term "cerebroprotection". Together with his research team, he oversaw the development, design, implementation, and execution of SPAN 1.0. The network proved capable of efficiently testing multiple potential cerebroprotective agents simultaneously, ultimately identifying one candidate for further investigation in stroke patients.

== Awards and honors ==
- 1998 – Elected Fellow of the American Academy of Neurology
- 2002 – Heart of Gold Honoree, American Heart Association San Diego
- 2002 – Elected Fellow, American Heart Association
- 2014 – Elected Fellow, European Stroke Organization
- 2019 – William M. Feinberg Award for Excellence in Clinical Stroke, American Heart Association
- 2023 – President's Lecture, International Society for Cerebral Blood Flow & Metabolism
- 2023 – Stroke Council Award and Lecture, American Heart Association
- 2024 – Pioneer in Medicine Award, Society for Vascular and Interventional Neurology

== Bibliography ==
=== Books ===
- Thrombolytic Therapy for Stroke (2001) ISBN 9780896037465
- Thrombolytic Therapy for Acute Stroke, 2nd Ed (2005) ISBN 9781588293985
- Thrombolytic Therapy for Acute Stroke,3rd Ed (2014) ISBN 9783319075747

=== Selected articles ===
- Lyden, P. D., & Hedges, B. (1992). Protective effect of synaptic inhibition during cerebral ischemia in rats and rabbits. Stroke, 23(10), 1463-1469.
- Lyden, P., Brott, T., Tilley, B., Welch, K. M., Mascha, E. J., Levine, S., ... & Marler, J. (1994). Improved reliability of the NIH Stroke Scale using video training. NINDS TPA Stroke Study Group. Stroke, 25(11), 2220-2226.
- Lyden, P. D., & Lonzo, L. (1994). Combination therapy protects ischemic brain in rats. A glutamate antagonist plus a gamma-aminobutyric acid agonist. Stroke, 25(1), 189-196.
- Lyden, P. D., Jackson-Friedman, C., Shin, C., & Hassid, S. (2000). Synergistic combinatorial stroke therapy: a quantal bioassay of a GABA agonist and a glutamate antagonist. Experimental neurology, 163(2), 477-489.
- Lyden, P., Pereira, B., Chen, B., Zhao, L., Lamb, J., Lei, I. F., & Rajput, P. (2014). Direct thrombin inhibitor argatroban reduces stroke damage in 2 different models. Stroke, 45(3), 896-899.
