= Ulrich Dirnagl =

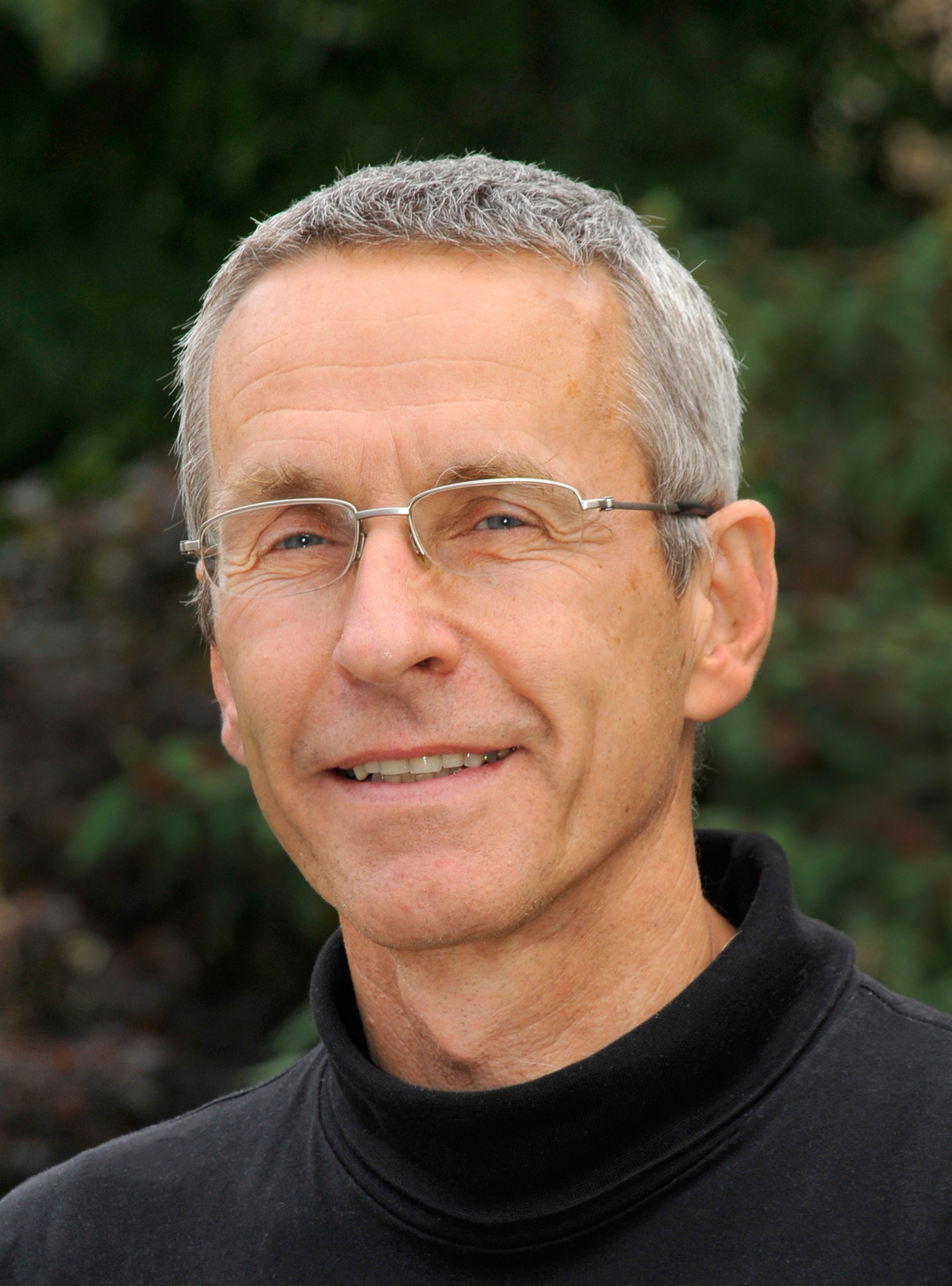
Ulrich Dirnagl (2015)

Ulrich Dirnagl (* 9 August 1960 in Munich) is a German neurologist and neuroscientist. He is the founding director of the QUEST Centers for Responsible Research, established in 2017 at the Berlin Institute of Health.

== Career ==
From 1980 to 1988, Ulrich Dirnagl studied medicine at LMU Munich and worked as a research associate in the neurology department. In this period he obtained a doctorate with his thesis on the etiology and significance of 0.5-2 minute oscillations of intracranial pressure, with Karl Max Einhäupl as his doctoral advisor. Between 1988 and 1989, he did research as a research fellow at the Cornell University Department of Neurology. After that, he returned to Munich for postdoctoral training in the clinic of neurology of LMU Munich. In 1993, he moved to Berlin where he obtained a residency as senior physician in the Charité neurology department. There he established the research lab Experimental Neurology which aimed to connect basic research in neuroscience with clinical neurology.

He acquired his Habilitation for experimental neurology at LMU Munich in December 1993. Supported by the Hermann and Lilly Schilling foundation for medical research, the Department of Experimental Neurology was founded at the Charité in Berlin in 1999, and Dirnagl was appointed to the corresponding chair. He led the Department of Experimental Neurology until May 2022. Additionally, Dirnagel is active in several initiatives and programs. From 2017 to 2025, he wrote the monthly column "Einsichten eines Wissenschaftsnarren" with critical analyses and commentaries on the science system for the life sciences magazine Laborjournal.

== Research ==
The research interests of Ulrich Dirnagl in experimental neurology focus on physiology and pathophysiology of cerebal blood flow regulation, stroke pathology and brain imaging.

Another focus of Dirnagl's work is the metascientific study of life sciences and especially stroke research. He has argued in a number of publications that insufficient quality standards hamper the successful translation from basic research to clinical application, for example lack of randomization and blinding, too small sample sizes, insufficient documentation and the difficulty of publishing results which contradict the original hypothesis.

== Positions and Memberships ==
- 1993–1999: Director of the research lab for experimental neurology, Charité
- 1999–2022: Director of the Department of Experimental Neurology, Charité
- since 1999: Vice director Neuroscience Center, Charité
- 2005–2007: Speaker of the German Research Foundation collaborative research center (Sonderforschungsbereich) SFB5007 on the relevance of non-neuron cells in neurological diseases
- since 2007: Member, board member and clinical coordinator of the excellency cluster NeuroCure
- 2007–2012: Secretary-general of the German Neuroscience Society (Neurowissenschaftliche Gesellschaft)
- 2008–2018: Founding director of Centrum für Schlaganfallforschung Berlin
- 2009–2016: Editor-in-Chief, Journal of Cerebral Blood Flow and Metabolism
- 2013–2017: Clinical coordinator at the German Center for Neurodegenerative Diseases
- 2017–2022: Visiting Professor University of Oxford
- since 2017: Founding director of the QUEST (Quality | Ethics | Open Science | Translation) Center for Responsible Research, Berlin Institute of Health
- since 2018: Elected Member of the Academia Europaea
