= Martien =

Martien is both a given name and a surname. Notable people with the name include:

- Martien Houtkooper (1891–1961), Dutch footballer
- Martien Kas (born 1966), Dutch neuroscientist
- Martien Vreijsen (born 1955), Dutch footballer
- Samuel W. Martien (1854–1946), American cotton planter and politician
