= Suzanne Dickson =

Swedish neurobiologist

Suzanne L Dickson
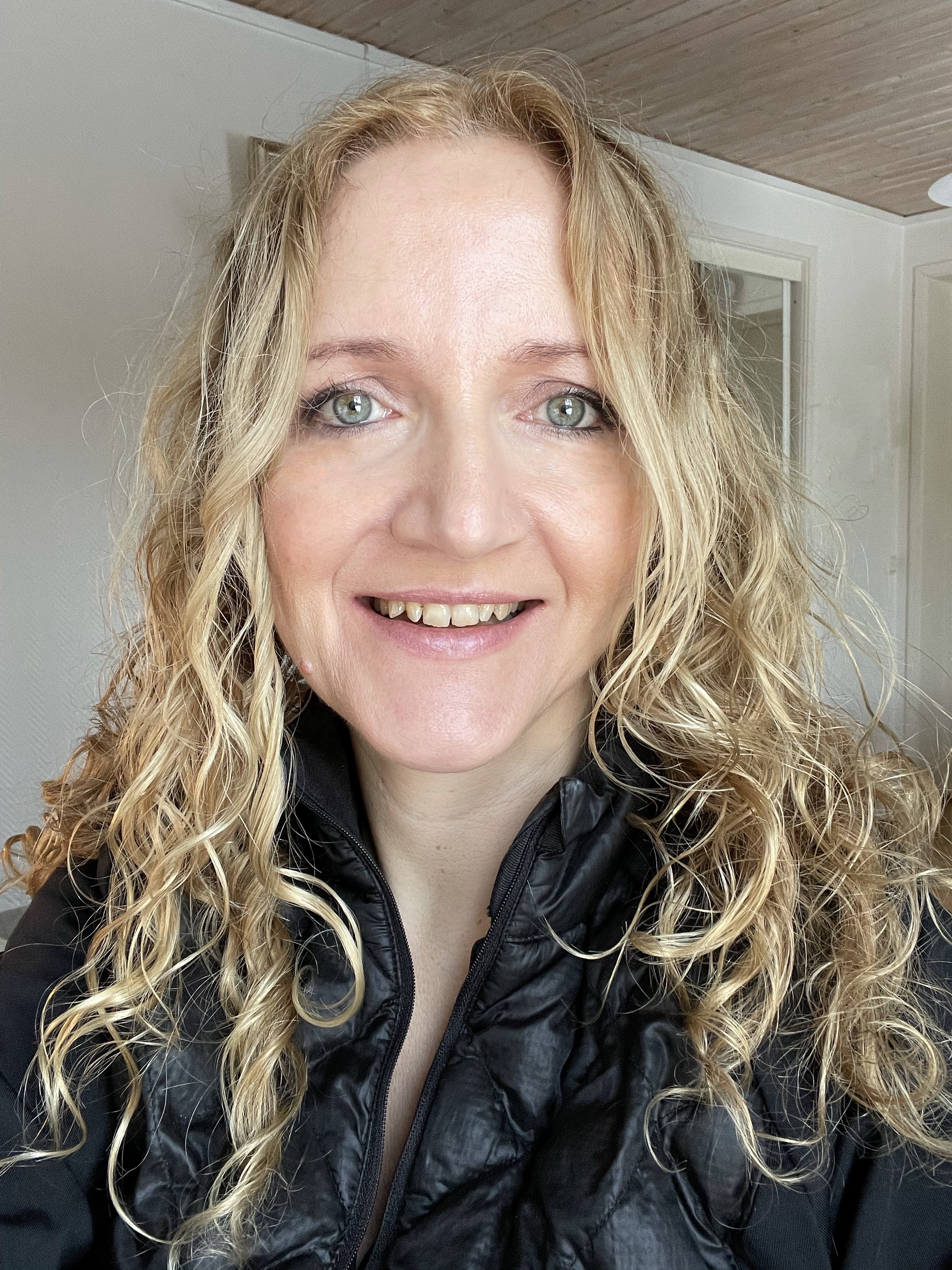
- Education: Ph.D. in Neuroendocrinology, University of Cambridge
- Known for: Neurobiology of appetite, ghrelin
- Scientific career
- Fields: Neuroscience
- Workplaces: University of Gothenburg, Gothenburg, Sweden

Suzanne L Dickson is a neurobiologist and Professor of Neuroendocrinology in the Department of Physiology within the Institute of Neuroscience and Physiology at the Sahlgrenska Academy at the University of Gothenburg in Sweden. She graduated from the University of Edinburgh with a B.Sc. (honours) in Pharmacology. Her doctorate research was undertaken at the Babraham Institute with Professor Gareth Leng and she graduated with a Ph.D. in Neuroendocrinology from the University of Cambridge in 1993. She is also an Honorary Professor in the College of Medicine and Veterinary Medicine at the University of Edinburgh.

She is Secretary and Executive Committee member of the European College of Neuropsychopharmacology.

== Career ==
Dickson works within many European Union and international organisations and societies to promote neuroendocrinological research, facilitate grant funding and training of Early Career Scientists. She is noted for her research into the neurobiology of appetite.

She was appointed Lecturer in Anatomy at King's College London in 1994. In 1996 she joined the Department of Physiology, Development and Neuroscience, University of Cambridge as Lecturer and was subsequently promoted to Senior lecturer. During this time she was a Fellow at Peterhouse, Cambridge.

Her research aims to unravel neurobiological pathways that respond to orexigenic signals, such as the hormone, ghrelin, and that drive feeding behaviours, not only food intake but also food choice, food anticipation, food reward and food motivation. This work involves studies in rats and transgenic mice and includes behavioural tasks, viral vector mapping, chemogenetics and RNAscope.

Dickson is President and Executive Committee member of board of the European Brain Council. She is also Secretary and Executive Board member of the European College of Neuropsychopharmacology (ECNP).

== Publications ==
Dickson has published peer-reviewed articles and book chapters to her name

== Editorial Boards ==
- Deputy Editor-in-Chief: Journal of Neuroendocrinology (2020-)
- Deputy Editor-in-Chief: Neuroscience Applied (2021-)
- Associate Editor: Neuroendocrinology (2014-2020)
- Associate Editor: Frontiers in Endocrinology - Neuroendocrine Science (2021-)
- Associate Editor: Frontiers in Nutrition (2014-2018)
- Book Editor: Masterclass in Neuroendocrinology: Neuroendocrinology of Appetite (Co-editing with Prof Julian Mercer)
- Editorial Board: Neuroendocrinology (1994-2020), Journal of Neuroendocrinology (2015-), American Journal of Physiology. Regulatory, Integrative and Comparative Physiology (2015-), Physiological Reports (2013-), Endocrinology (2016-2020), Behavioural Pharmacology (2020-).
- Editor of a Special Issue of the International Journal of Molecular Sciences on “ Neurobiological perspectives on ghrelin”, published in 2017.
- Editor (together with Julie Chowen) for a special issue of the journal Neuroscience on “Neuroscience of appetite, metabolism and obesity” (published late in 2019).

== Scientific Boards ==
- President of EBC (European Brain Council; 2023-) and Board member (2017-)
- Secretary of ECNP (European College of Neuropsychopharmacology; 2020-) and ECNP Executive Committee member (2016-)
- Chair of the ECNP Committee for the Workshop for Early Career Scientists in Europe (2020-2022) and committee member (2014-)
- Chair of the Programme Committee for the International Congress of Neuroendocrinology ICN2022
- Member of the Executive Committee for SSIB (Society for the Study of Ingestive Behaviour, 2016-2019)
- Member of the Programme Committee of SSIB (2018-2020)
- Member of the Executive Council for the International Federation for Neuroendocrinology (INF; 2014-)
- Member of the ECNP Networks committee (2017-)
- Member of the ECNP SAP committee (2017-2019)
- Founder of the https://www.ecnp.eu/research-innovation/ECNP-networks/List-ECNP-Networks/Nutrition, including chair (2017-2020) and co-chair (2020-)
- Founder and co-chair of BRAINFOOD, an EBRA (European Brain Research Area) cluster of the European Brain Council.
- Member of the Board of FENS (2020-)

== Grant and Administrative Boards ==
- Co-chair of the mental health panel for the Swedish Research Council for Medicine and health (2021-) and Panel member (2017-)
- Member of the Sahlgrenska Academy Board (the executive medical faculty board) at the University of Gothenburg (2015-2018)
- Member of the Horizon 2020 Swedish workgroup for health (2015-).
- Member of the Core Facility committee at University of Gothenburg (2016-2021).
- Member of the PhD examinations committee at University of Gothenburg (2016-2020)
- EC panel member for assessing Framework 7 and Horizon2020 grants.
- Ad-hoc reviewer for many European grants (in UK, France, Denmark, Norway, Italy and Latvia).
