= Brenda Penninx =

Dutch professor of psychiatry

Brenda Penninx (born 1970) is a Dutch researcher in psychiatry and professor of psychiatry epidemiology at the Free University of Amsterdam. She is specialized in depression.

== Career ==
Penninx has especially studied psychosocial, biological and genetic risk factors for depression and anxiety. She has also focused on the social effects of psychiatric illnesses and the interaction of these illnesses with somatic health. Pennix has participated as a researcher in several Dutch and international longitudinal cohort studies on mental health with large datasets. Since 2004, she has been the principal investigator of the Netherlands Study of Depression and Anxiety (NESDA).

Penninx is a prolific scientist who, together with her colleagues, has published more than 800 international scientific articles that have been cited more than 156,900 times (h-index >200). Penninx is among the most cited researchers in her discipline in the world (Clarivate: Highly Cited Researcher, Psychiatry and Psychology; annually since 2015). She had already supervised dozens of dissertation theses by 2021.

Penninx was elected a member of the Royal Netherlands Academy of Sciences (KNAW) in 2016. She is currently serving as Treasurer of the European College of Neuropsychopharmacology (ECNP) for the term 2022–2025.
