= Celso Arango =

Spanish psychiatrist

Celso Arango (Palma de Mallorca, 1968) is a psychiatrist who has worked as a clinician, researcher, and educator in psychiatry and mental health, notably in the field of child and adolescent psychiatry, psychosis, and mental health promotion.

== Biography ==
Professor Celso Arango is currently Chair of the Department of Child and Adolescent Psychiatry at Hospital Universitario La Paz in Madrid and Distinguished Researcher at Universidad Autónoma de Madrid. Internationally, he is Professor of Psychiatry at the Maryland Psychiatric Research Center of the University of Maryland in Baltimore, Adjunct Professor of Psychiatry at UCSF in San Francisco, and a visiting professor of psychiatry at King's College London.

Professor Arango served as Chair of the Child and Adolescent Department of Psychiatry at Hospital General Universitario Gregorio Marañón in Madrid from 2012 to 2025, during which he was also Director of the Gregorio Marañón Psychiatric and Mental Health Institute between 2019 and 2025, and Tenured Full Professor of Psychiatry at Complutense University in Madrid from 2018 to 2025.

From 2008 to 2016, he was the Scientific Director of the Spanish Psychiatric Research Network (CIBERSAM). Also in 2008, the Spanish Ministry of Health, Social Services, and Equality awarded him its Medal of Honor, the “Cruz de la Orden Civil de Sanidad". Between 2012 and 2014, he was the Fundación Alicia Koplowitz Endowed Chair for Child Psychiatry at the Universidad Complutense of Madrid, and he has been a board member of the European Brain Council (the European Commission's advisory body) since 2013. In December 2014, he was appointed chairman of the National Commission for the Child and Adolescent Psychiatry Specialty by the Ministry of Health, Social Services and Equality. In 2020 he was awarded by the American College of Psychiatrists with the Dean Award, by The International College of Neuropsychopharmacology with the CINP Sumitomo/Sunovion Brain Health Clinical Research Award.

Dr. Arango is a past president of the European College of Neuropsychopharmacology, having served the 2019–2022 term. In 2022, he was appointed as president of the Spanish Psychiatry Society and as member of The Royal Academy of Medicine of Spain. Recently, he has been elected international member of the American National Academy of Medicine (NAM) and he has been awarded the Margarita Salas Award in the category of scientific career by the Community of Madrid. He is also President Elect of the European Psychiatric Association (EPA) and Member of the Section of Physiology and Neuroscience of Academia Europaea.

He has written numerous articles that have been published in journals such as Nature, Nature Neuroscience, Nature Medicine, Nature Genetics, JAMA Psychiatry, Lancet Psychiatry, World Psychiatry, and American Journal of Psychiatry, and is included in the Top 2% Scientists ranking of Stanford University and in the Highly Cited Researchers 2022, 2023 and 2024.

== Selected publications ==
Arango has written more than 830 peer-reviewed articles, including:

- Arango et al. Safety and efficacy of agomelatine in children and adolescents with major depressive disorder receiving psychosocial counselling: a double-blind, randomised, controlled, phase 3 trial in nine countries. Lancet Psychiatry. 2022 Feb;9(2):113-124.
- Andreu-Bernabeu et al. Polygenic contribution to the relationship of loneliness and social isolation with schizophrenia. Nature Communications. 2022 Jan 10;13(1):51.
- Mantua et al. Digital health technologies in clinical trials for central nervous system drugs: an EU regulatory perspective. Nature Reviews Drug Discovery. 2021 Feb;20(2):83-84.
- Davies et al. Using common genetic variation to examine phenotypic expression and risk prediction in 22q11.2 deletion syndrome. Nature Medicine. 2020 Dec;26(12):1912-1918.
- Guloksuz et al. Examining the independent and joint effects of molecular genetic liability and environmental exposures in schizophrenia: results from the EUGEI study. World Psychiatry. 2019 Jun;18(2):173-182.
- Jongsma et al. Treated Incidence of Psychotic Disorders in the Multinational EU-GEI Study. JAMA Psychiatry. 2018 Jan 1;75(1):36-46.
- Lim et al. Rates, distribution and implications of postzygotic mosaic mutations in autism spectrum disorder. Nature Neuroscience. 2017 Sep;20(9):1217-1224.
- Galling et al. Type 2 Diabetes Mellitus in Youth Exposed to Antipsychotics: A Systematic Review and Meta-analysis. JAMA Psychiatry. 2016 Mar;73(3):247-59.
- Vorstman JA, et al. Deletion Syndrome. Cognitive Decline Preceding the Onset of Psychosis in Patients with 22q11.2 Deletion Syndrome. JAMA Psychiatry. 2015 Apr;72(4):377-85.
- Steinberg S, et al. Common variant at 16p11.2 conferring risk of psychosis. Molecular Psychiatry. 2014 Jan;19(1):108-14.
- Arango C. Child neuropsychopharmacology: good news... the glass is half full. World Psychiatry. 2013 Jun;12(2):128-9.
- Arango C et al. Progressive brain changes in children and adolescents with first-episode psychosis. JAMA Psychiatry. 2012 Jan; 69(1):16-26.
- Steinberg S et al. Common Variants at VRK2 and TCF4 Conferring Risk of Schizophrenia. Hum Mol Genet. 2011 Oct; 20(20):4076-81.
- Arango C et al. Lessons learned about poor insight. Schizophr Bull. 2011 Jan; 37(1):27-8.
- Arango C. Attenuated psychotic symptoms syndrome: how it may affect child and adolescent psychiatry. Eur Child Adolesc Psychiatry. 2011 Feb; 20(2): 67–70.
