= Guy Goodwin =

British neurophysiologist

Guy Manning Goodwin
- Born: 8 November 1947 (age 78)
- Education: B.A. in Animal Physiology, DPhil in Neurophysiology, University of Oxford
- Known for: Neurobiology of bipolar disorder, neuroscience of mood disorders and brain structure/function imaging
- Awards: Mogens Schou Award for Research, NHS Live Innovation award
- Scientific career
- Fields: Psychiatry
- Institutions: University of Oxford, Department of Psychiatry (Medical Sciences Division)

Guy Goodwin is a senior research fellow and until recently was the W.A. Handley Professor of Psychiatry at the University of Oxford (2014). A fellow of the Academy of Medical Sciences, Goodwin has served as principal investigator in many clinical trials for the treatment of bipolar disorder. He is also an Emeritus Senior Investigator at the National Institute for Health and Care Research (NIHR) and has been on the advisory boards of numerous research councils. He was President of the European College of Neuropsychopharmacology from 2013 to 2016.

== Career ==
=== Research focus/interests ===
Goodwin's research focuses on the neurobiology of mood disorders, notably bipolar disorder and its treatment. In addition to developing novel treatments for mood disorders, Goodwin is interested in the impact of treatments on both the physiological and psychological levels, using brain imaging techniques to study the effects of treatment on brain structure and function as well as the connection between depression and memory impairment.

=== Notable contributions to research ===
Goodwin's findings on the impact of depression on brain tissue and memory have led to greater interest in neurogenesis when developing antidepressants as well as the role of cognition in the treatment of depression.

Goodwin was the principal investigator of many clinical trials for treatments of bipolar affective disorder, including the BALANCE, CEQUEL, and OXTEXT studies. He serves on the advisory boards of many biopharmaceutical companies including AstraZeneca and Pfizer.

=== Past appointments ===
After completing his DPhil in Neurophysiology at Oxford, Goodwin qualified in psychiatry and went on to become a Clinical Scientist and Consultant Psychiatrist in the MRC Brain Metabolism Unit at the University of Edinburgh for 10 years. He then returned to Oxford as Professor of Psychiatry.

Professor Goodwin has been the head of Oxford University's Department of Psychiatry since 2006, and a fellow of Merton College, Oxford since 1996.

=== Awards ===
Goodwin has won numerous awards, most recently the Mogens Schou Award for Research (2009) and the NHS Live Innovation Award with Professor John Geddes for developing the True Colours system that allowed them to remotely monitor the symptoms of their bipolar patients.

=== Positions of trust and research assessments ===
Dr. Goodwin is currently President of the European College of Neuropsychopharmacology (2013–16). From 1997 to 2007, he was the non-executive Director and Vice-Chair of the Oxfordshire and Buckinghamshire NHS Mental Health Trust Board.

Goodwin has served on numerous advisory boards including the Evaluation committee for neuroscience, neurology, and psychiatry of the Agence Nationale de Recherche, France, the Wellcome Trust Neurosciences Panel, the Council of the British Association for Psychopharmacology, and Medical Research Council's Clinical fellowships panel and Advisory Board. He was elected president of the British Association for Psychopharmacology in 2004–05.

=== Publications ===
Goodwin has published extensively, authoring a book on bipolar disorder as well as numerous articles. He also regularly reviews books in the field.
