= International Society for Cerebral Blood Flow & Metabolism =

- Abbreviation: ISCBFM
- Founded: 1981
- Type: Learned society
- Location(s): 1300 Piccard Drive, Suite LL-14; Rockville, MD 20850 USA
- Website: www.iscbfm.org

The International Society for Cerebral Blood Flow & Metabolism is a professional society based in Rockville, Maryland for physicians and scientists focused on cerebrovascular function.

== History ==
Technical improvements in the study of cerebral blood flow pioneered by Niels Lassen and David Ingvar in the mid-twentieth century drove demand for meetings dedicated to the discipline. In 1965, the first regional Cerebral Blood Flow (rCBF) symposium was held in Lund, Sweden. In March 1980, following discussions between Bo K. Siesjö and Louis Sokoloff, a steering committee society was formed, including Sokoloff, Siesjö, Konstantin A. Hossman, Igor Klatzo, Eric Mackenzie, Marcus Raichle, Martin Reivich, and Fred Plum. The International Society for Cerebral Blood Flow & Metabolism was first announced at the 1981 rCBF meeting in St. Louis, Missouri.

== Annual meeting ==
ISCBFM holds an annual meeting called Brain & Brain Pet. The biannual meeting is held in cities throughout the world, with the 2027 meeting taking place in Suzhou, China.

== Publishing ==
The Journal of Cerebral Blood Flow & Metabolism has been an important element of the ISCFBM since the organization's founding. Additionally, ISCFBM has published a newsletter titled The Organ since 1990.
