= Herdís Sveinsdóttir =

Icelandic academic

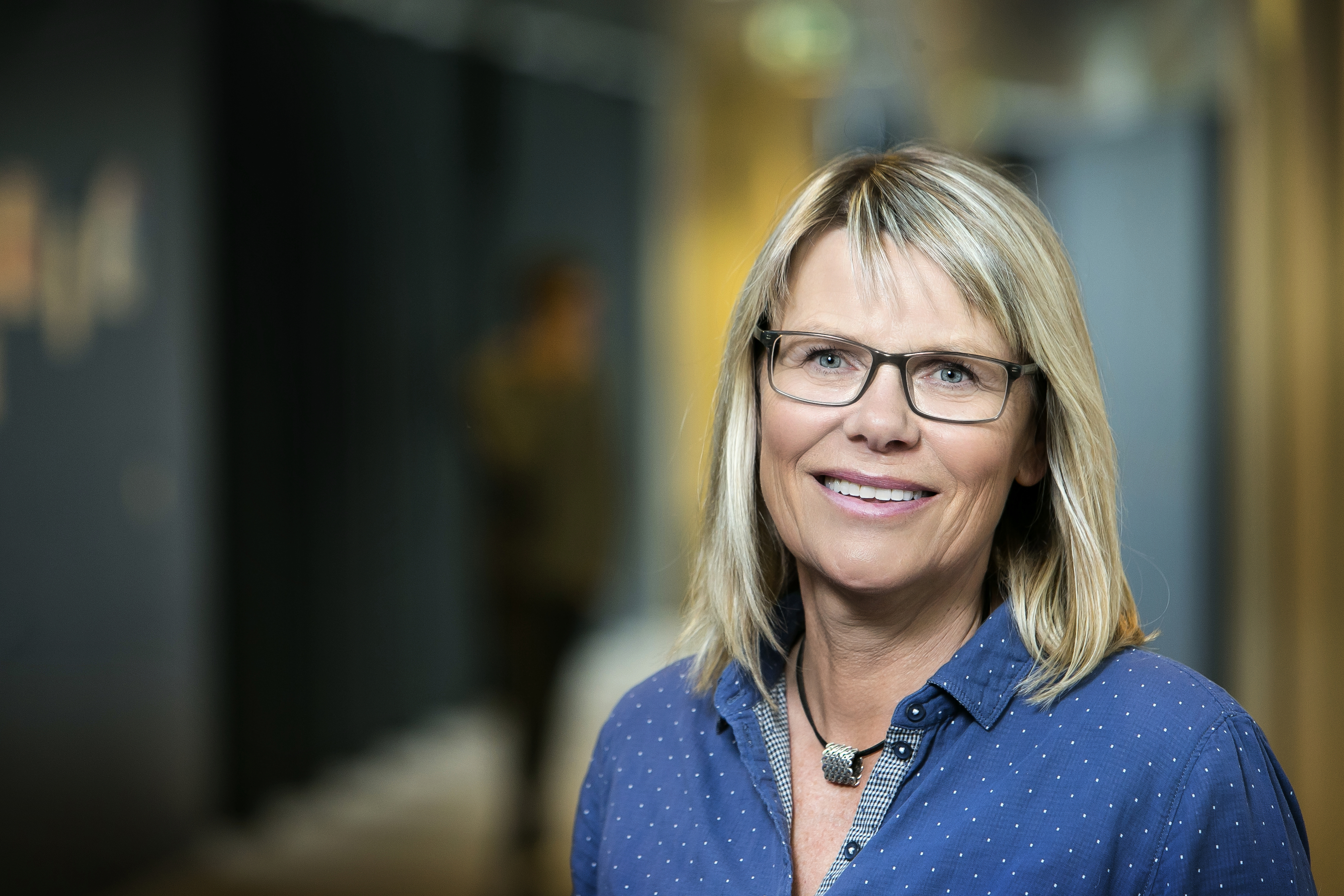
- Born: 1956 (age 69–70)
- Occupation: Professor in nursing at the University of Iceland

Herdís Sveinsdóttir (born 1956) is a professor in nursing and dean at the Faculty of Nursing of the University of Iceland.

== Professional experience ==
Herdís completed a BS in nursing from the University of Iceland in 1981, a master's from the University of Michigan, Ann Arbor, United States, in 1987 and a doctorate from the University of Umeå, Sweden, in 2000. Herdís began working at the University of Iceland in 1987 and is now a professor and dean at the Faculty of Nursing. In parallel with her work at the university, she was a registered nurse at the National University Hospital of Iceland from 1987 to 1994, and, continuously since 2004, she has been Director of research on the nursing of surgical patients at the hospital's Surgical Division. Herdís was chair and president of the Icelandic Nurses Association from 1999 to 2003.

== Other work and projects ==
Herdís has held diverse positions of confidentiality outside as well as within the University of Iceland. It is worth mentioning that she was chairman of the board for the course of study in nursing from 1989 to 1994. She was a board member of the Research Institute of Nursing as of 1998 and its chair from 2003 to 2008. In addition, she was a board member of the Research Institute of Feminist Studies and its chair from 1999 to 2000 and 2009 to 2010. She was on UI's Teaching Committee from 1998 to 2000, chair of UI's Equal Rights Committees from 2014 to 2017, on UI's Science Committee, and chair of the Specialists Committee of the School of Health Sciences from 2008 to 2011, on the Rector's Committee on the promotion of academic employees at the University of Iceland from 2011 to 2014, and on the Rector's Selection Committee on assessment of the academic qualifications of National University Hospital employees from 2003 to 2016. She has been a board member of the School of Health Sciences since 2017. From 2006 to 2017, she was a board member of the National University Hospital's Science Committee. From 1999 to 2004, Herdís was a board member of NNF (Nordic Nurses' Federation), on the Representatives Council of the International Council of Nurses, on the Standing Committee of Nurses of the EU, and a board member of the Icelandic Nurses’ Pension Fund. She was also chair of its board of directors in 2002. She was on the board of the Occupational Safety and Health Authority and was vice-chair of the Icelandic Confederation of University Graduates from 2000 to 2004. Herdís was on the board of the Research Center for Occupational Health & Working Life for several years, starting in 2004.

== Research ==
Herdís's research related to nursing and health is multifaceted. However, her main research field has been women's health, the state of health of surgery patients, occupational health and the work and work environment of nurses and nursing students. Her research on women's health has been on their reproductive period (from menarche to menopause). Her PhD dissertation dealt with Icelandic women's premenstrual tension. In later years, she has also looked into and been involved in research on menopause, menarche, women's self-objectification, their quality of life, and home births. The research of Herdís and her collaborators on surgery patients has focused on examining their symptoms, recovery process, and the effect of the procedures on the patients' circumstances. The research on work environment, for example, has aimed at examining the gist of nurses' work, management, job satisfaction, stress, and work skills. She is and has been a collaborator on domestic and foreign research projects, as the bibliography below reflects.

== Family ==
Herdís is the daughter of Sveinn Finnsson (1920–1993), lawyer, and Herdís Sigurðardóttir (b. 1926), business woman. She is married to Rolf E. Hansson, specialist in periodontal disease, and they have four children and six grandchildren.

== Articles ==
- Sveinsdóttir, H., Biering, P. og Ramel, A. (2006). Occupational Stress, Job Satisfaction, and Working Environment Among Icelandic Nurses. International Journal of Nursing Studies, 43(7), 875–889.
- Sveinsdóttir, H., Lundman, B. & Norberg, A. (1999). Women´s perceptions of phenomena they label premenstrual tension: Normal experiences reflecting ordinary behaviour. Journal of Advanced Nursing. 30, 916–925.
- Halfdansdottir, B., Wilson, ME., Hildingsson, I., Olafsdottir, OA., Smarason, AK., Sveinsdottir, H. (2015). Outcome of planned home and hospital births among low-risk women in Iceland in 2005-2009:A retrospective cohort study. Birth-Issues in Perinatal Care, 42(1), 16–26.
- Sveinsdóttir, H. (2018). Menstruation, objectification and health-related quality of life: a questionnaire study. Journal of Clinical Nursing. 27(3-4), e503-e513
- Sveinsdóttir, H., Bragadóttir, H., Jonsdottir, HH., Blöndal, K. (2018). The content of nurse unit managers’ work: a descriptive study using daily activity diaries. Scandinavian Journal of Caring Sciences, 32, 861–870.
- Scheving-Thorsteinsson, H. & Sveinsdóttir, H. (2014). Readiness for and predictors of evidence‐based practice of acute‐care nurses: a cross‐sectional postal survey. Scandinavian Journal of Caring Sciences, 28(3), 572–581.
- S. Zoëga, H. Sveinsdottir, G. H. Sigurdsson, T. Aspelund, S. E. Ward & Gunnarsdottir, S. (2015). Quality Pain Management in the Hospital Setting from the Patient’s Perspective. Pain Practice, 15(3), 236–246.
