= Andreas Reif =

German psychiatrist

Andreas Reif (born 23 July 1971) is a German psychiatrist. He is director of the Clinic for Psychiatry, Psychosomatics and Psychotherapy at the University Hospital Frankfurt.

== Life ==
Reif studied human medicine at the Julius Maximilian University of Würzburg and received his doctorate there at the Institute of Pharmacology. He then completed his specialist training as a psychiatrist in the clinic for psychiatry, psychosomatics and psychotherapy there, first under H. Beckmann and then under J. Deckert. He started his scientific career in Klaus-Peter Lesch's working group for molecular psychiatry, where he mainly dealt with the genetics of mental illnesses. In 2009 he completed his habilitation on the role of NO synthase in mental illnesses and was appointed senior physician.

In 2008, he established a clinical focus on bipolar disorders at the Clinic for Psychiatry, Psychosomatics and Psychotherapy at the University Hospital of Würzburg. Shortly thereafter, in 2009, he was appointed W2 Professor for Psychiatry and deputy director of the Clinic and Polyclinic for Psychiatry, Psychosomatics and Psychotherapy at the University Hospital of Würzburg.

Since August 2014, Reif has been director of the Clinic for Psychiatry, Psychosomatics and Psychotherapy at the Johann Wolfgang Goethe University in Frankfurt am Main.

Andreas Reif's clinical interests primarily include affective disorders - particularly suicide prevention, treatment-resistant depression and bipolar disorder - as well as adult ADHD. His scientific focus is on the field of translational psychiatry: with his work he tries to understand mental illnesses from the molecule through the neural system to the disease itself. This should help to diagnose and treat mental illnesses more precisely and individually.

In 2018 he was elected a member of the Academia Europaea. Reif is the President-Elect of the European College of Neuropsychopharmacology (ECNP), assuming office for the term 2022–2025.

== Publications (selection) ==
Reif published more than 500 scientific papers and numerous book chapters.

== Honors and awards (selection) ==
- 2004: Collegium Internationale Neuro-Psychopharmacologicum (CINP): Rafaelsen Young Investigators Award
- 2004: Lundbeck Institute Neuroscience Foundation Sponsorship Award
- 2006: European College of Neuropsychopharmacology: ECNP Fellowship Award
- 2007: Young Psychiatrists Fellowship Award
- 2008: Essex Research Award
- 2009: Early Career Investigator Award

== Memberships and offices (selection) ==
- since 2013: Treasurer of the German Society for Bipolar Disorders
- since 2016: President of the German Alliance Against Depression, Frankfurt am Main e. V.
- since 2016: Board member of the German Society for Psychiatry and Psychotherapy, Psychosomatics and Neurology
- 2017/2018: Chairman of the Association of Chairholders of Psychiatry and Psychotherapy (LIPPs)
- since 2019: Member of the executive committee (since 2022 President-Elect) of the European College of Neuropsychopharmacology (ECNP)
- 2019–2021: Chair of the ECNP Congress Scientific Program Committee
