= Sveinsson =

Sveinsson is a patronymic (föðurnöfn, “fathername”) in Icelandic, meaning son of Sveinn. In Icelandic names, a föðurnöfn is not a surname. The name refers to:

- Ásmundur Sveinsson (1893–1982), Icelandic sculptor
- Atli Heimir Sveinsson (1938–2019), Icelandic composer
- Brynjólfur Sveinsson (1605–1675), Icelandic Lutheran clergyman; bishop of Skálholt; his face is on the 1000 kronur note
- Einar Sveinsson (1906–1973), Icelandic architect
- Jakob Jóhann Sveinsson (b. 1982), Icelandic Olympic swimmer
- Jón Sveinsson (1857–1944), Icelandic Jesuit and author of children’s stories
- Kjartan Sveinsson (b. 1978), Icelandic multi-instrumental musician

== See also ==
- Sveinsdóttir, the equivalent feminine patronymic
