= European College of Neuropsychopharmacology =

European scientific organization

- Abbreviation: ECNP
- Formation: 1987
- Type: Non-Profit Scientific Organization
- Headquarters: Utrecht, The Netherlands
- Location: Daltolaan 400, 3584 BK
- President: Martien Kas, The Netherlands
- Key people: Elisabeth Binder (Vice-president); Gitte Moos Knudsen (Past-President); Andreas Reif (president-elect); Suzanne Dickson (secretary); Brenda Penninx (treasurer)
- Website: www.ecnp.eu

The European College of Neuropsychopharmacology (ECNP) is a European scientific association. Its core is around 1,000 personal members, who are researchers, clinicians and allied professionals in the fields of translational neuroscience and applied brain research. Most are in Europe, though members come from around the world. The larger ECNP community embraces all those who are committed to translating discoveries in brain science into new and better treatments for disorders of the brain.

ECNP is a non-profit organisation, independent, self-funded and apolitical. It not aligned to any government or country and does not espouse any political agenda.

The origins of the College lie in pharmacology and the science of developing compounds that act on the central nervous system to treat the symptoms of neuropsychiatric conditions. Today, however, ECNP embraces all forms of brain research as it applies to human brain disorders. This covers all kinds of treatments, including not just medicines, but talking therapies, neuromodulation, and technology-enabled e-health.

== History ==
In 1984 representatives of neuropsychopharmacological societies from across Europe suggested there might be room for a European structure. A meeting to discuss this plan further was held in Copenhagen in May 1985. It was decided that a European College of Neuropsychopharmacology would be founded. A Working Group was formed to plan of the association’s inaugural scientific congress. This congress was held in Brussels in 1987. Around 500 people attended. The Working Group consisted of:

- Carlos Ballús, Spain
- Per Bech, Denmark
- Giovanni Cassano, Italy
- Alexandra Delini-Stula, Switzerland
- Markus Gastpar, Switzerland
- Carl-Gerhard Gottfries, Sweden
- Lars F. Gram, Denmark
- Max Hamilton, United Kingdom
- Paul Kielholz, Switzerland
- Julien Mendlewicz, Belgium
- Giorgio Racagni, Italy
- Eckart Ruther, Germany
- Michael Trimble, United Kingdom
- Willem Verhoeven, Netherlands
- Jennifer Wakelin, Netherlands
- Édouard Zarifian, France

In 1993 the College established a permanent secretariat in Utrecht, Netherlands.

== Organisation ==
The ECNP's executive organ is the Executive Committee. The Executive Committee consists of six officers (the president, vice-president, president-elect, past-president, secretary and treasurer) and a maximum of six councillors. The Executive Committee has a three year term.

The 2026-2028 Executive Committee consists of:

Andreas Reif, Germany, President
David Baldwin, United Kingdom, Vice-president
Martien Kas, The Netherlands, Past-president
Brenda Penninx, The Netherlands, President-elect
John Cryan, Ireland, Treasurer
Marion Leboyer, France, Secretary

Councillors
Livia De Picker, Belgium
Christina Dalla, Greece
Vibe Gedsø Frøkjær, Denmark
Marin Jukić, Serbia
Carmen Moreno, Spain

Advisers and ex-officio members
Gerry Dawson, United Kingdom, Expert

Suzanne Dickson, Sweden, Expert

James Rowe, United Kingdom, Expert

Barbara Franke, Chair, Scientific Programme Committee

Andreas Meyer-Lindenberg, Germany, Editor-in-chief Neuroscience Applied
Eduard Vieta, Spain, Editor-in-chief European Neuropsychopharmacology ENP

Alexander Schubert, The Netherlands, Executive Director

Paul Boerboom, Belgium, Financial Adviser to the Executive Committee

Past presidents

Martien Kas, The Netherlands (2022-2025)

Gitte Moos Knudsen, Denmark (2019-2022)
Celso Arango, Spain (2016-2019)
Guy Goodwin, United Kingdom (2013-2016)
Joseph Zohar, Israel (2010-2013)
David Nutt, United Kingdom (2007-2010)
Julien Mendlewicz, Belgium (2004-2007)
Yves Lecrubier, France (2002-2004)
Jan M. van Ree, Netherlands (1998-2002)
Manfred Ackenheil, Germany (1995-1998)
Stuart A. Montgomery, United Kingdom (1992-1995)
Salomon Z. Langer, France (1989-1992)
Carl-Gerhard Gottfries, Sweden (1987-1989)

The Executive Committee oversees the work of various sub-committees of the Executive Committees. These committees are staffed by scientists working in the field of neuropsychopharmacology.

Abstract and Poster Committee

The Abstract and Poster Committee oversees the abstract and poster process of the ECNP Congress.

Award Committee

The Award Committee reviews applications for the ECNP Neuropsychopharmacology Award. The terms and criteria for this award, however, are set by the Executive Committee.

Early Career Academy Board

The ECA board governs the Early Career Academy. The Early Career Academy serves as a springboard, facilitating sustained engagement of Early Career Scientists and support them throughout their careers (within ECNP).

Educational Committee

The Educational Committee is charged with propagating best practices in European applied neuroscience, from research methods and to clinical standards. As such, it oversees ECNP's training activities and educational programmes, especially for early career scientists.

Networks Board

The ECNP Networks Board is responsible for guiding and overseeing the activities of ECNP Networks, ensuring strategic direction, inclusiveness, and efficiency. The Board plays a crucial role in fostering collaboration, supporting translational neuroscience research, and strengthening ECNP’s research network.

Networks Advisory Panel

With the growing importance of ECNP Networks, ensuring their optimal functioning and impact is essential. The ECNP Networks Advisory Panel aims to enhance the impact of ECNP Networks by guiding their development, identifying research gaps, and evaluating performance. Working alongside the Networks Board, the panel ensures objective recommendations to strengthen collaboration, optimise output, and support the Networks’ role in advancing neuroscience.

Early Career Advisory Panel (ECAP)

Six years ago ECNP founded the Early Career Advisory Panel (ECAP) to advise on the needs of future members of the College, to give input on development of Early Career Scientist activities and initiatives, to help generate activities for Early Career Scientists and clinicians, and to receive feedback on current activities.

Neuroscience-based Nomenclature Advisory Board

The NbN Advisory Board is constituted of leading researchers and opinion leaders in the field neuropsychopharmacology.

Neuroscience-based Nomenclature Taskforce

The NbN Taskforce is constituted by representatives of the leading scientific associations in the field of neuropsychopharmacology and drug classification internationally.

New Frontiers Programme Committee

The ECNP New Frontiers Meeting fosters high-level exchange between scientists, industry leaders, and regulators to bridge the gap between research and treatment development. It provides a neutral platform for cross-sector collaboration in CNS research, aiming to advance new therapies. The topic and committee are selected annually through an open call in September.

PsychX Programme Committee

The PsychX Programme Committee curates topics and identifies potential speakers for the monthly PsychX webinar series, mapping out the agenda for the upcoming six months.

Roadmap Meeting Programme Committee 2027

The committee is responsible for developing the programme of the meeting and for guiding the ongoing discussion the meeting is designed to stimulate. All members sit in their personal capacity as independent subject-matter experts.

Roadmap Steering Group

The committee represents key stakeholder communities in the field, in the academic, industrial and regulatory sectors, in Europe and North America.

Workshop Committee

The workshop Committee is the leading body behind the annual ECNP Workshop on Applied Neuroscience attended by 100 Early Career Scientists. The Workshop fosters the scientific development of European (pre-) doctorates and medical residents.

=== Committees independent from the Executive committee ===
Nominating Committee

The Nominating Committee nominates candidates for the future Executive Committee (EC).

Scientific Advisory Panel

The Scientific Advisory Panel (SAP) is ECNP’s scientific sounding board, providing guidance and content advice in ECNP’s key areas of scientific focus in disorders, interventions and methods.

Scientific Programme Committee (ECNP Congress)

The independent Scientific Programme Committee (SPC) is charged with ensuring that the congress programme is innovative, of a uniformly high standard and balanced across the field of applied and translational neuroscience.

External Review Board

The External Review Board of ECNP oversees ECNP’s governance and the quality assurance of its activities. The External Review Board of the ECNP can be contacted via the ECNP Office or confidentially via the chair of the committee.

== Activities ==
- ECNP Congress, Europe’s leading platform for the communication and cross-fertilisation of research results and ideas in disease-targeted brain research, attended annually by nearly 7,000 psychiatrists, neuroscientists, neurologists and psychologists from around the world.
- ECNP New Frontiers Meetings, high-level scientific incubators for cross-talk between researchers, industry and regulators on key future trends and frontier developments.
- ECNP Roadmap Meeting on Precision Psychiatry, for international consensus-building on the case for precision psychiatry approaches and strategies for implementation.
- ECNP Workshop on Applied Neuroscience, for Europe’s outstanding (pre-)doctorate and psychiatric resident researchers.
- ECNP Workshop on Clinical Research Methods, training in key critical approaches for up-and-coming research clinicians.

== Initiatives ==
- ECNP Networks, clusters leading European researchers, organised around key topics and themes in the field.
- ECNP Knowledge Hub, for high-quality content about and training in the latest translational developments and insights for both clinical and non-clinical scientists, including Courses, Webinars, and Podcasts.
- Neuroscience-based Nomenclature, the ECNP-led collaboration to revise the classification of psychiatric medications.
- ECNP Early Career Academy, for future leaders in the field of applied and translational neuroscience.

== Awards ==
ECNP Negative Results Prize in Clinical Neuroscience

The ECNP Negative Results Prize in Clinical Neuroscience recognises those who have made exceptional contributions to CNS treatment development by publishing clinical research with negative findings.

Best Negative Data Prize

The Best Negative Data Prize is a collaboration between ECNP and U.S.-based non-profit research organisation Cohen Veterans Bioscience to recognise published "negative" scientific results or results of studies that do not confirm the expected outcome or original hypothesis.

ECNP Citation Prize

The ECNP Citation Prize recognises and encourage impactful original research in the ECNP journal, European Neuropsychopharmacology (ENP). It is awarded to the most cited research paper in the preceding two years.

ECNP Neuropsychopharmacology Award

The ECNP Neuropsychopharmacology Award recognises exceptional research achievements in applied and translational neuroscience.

Lifetime Achievement Award

The award recognises individuals who have made career-long contributions to building the field of applied and translational neuroscience in Europe, at the national or international level.

ECNP Poster Award

Outstanding posters presented at the congress are awarded the ECNP Poster Award.

ECNP Public Choice Poster Award

The best poster presented at the congress that is chosen by the public is awarded the ECNP Public Choice Poster Award.

ECNP Excellence Award

The ECNP Excellence Award was established to encourage Early Career Scientists (ECS) resident in Europe and/or residents of a European Country with a Developing Country (CDE) to present a poster during the annual ECNP Congress.

ECNP Rising Star Award

The ECNP Rising Star Award honours an Early Career Scientist whose research in applied and translational neuroscience has the potential to advance the science and treatment and prevention of brain disorders.

== Publications ==
The ECNP publishes:

- European Neuropsychopharmacology, which is a monthly peer-reviewed scientific journal. Eduard Vieta is the Editor-in-chief.
- Neuroscience Applied, a fully open-access scientific journal, targeting the intersection between neuroscience, applications and new treatment horizons. Andreas Meyer-Lindenberg is the Editor-in-chief.
- E-News, ECNP’s monthly electronic news bulletin.
- Message of the President, the monthly letter from ECNP’s president.
- In-depth interviews

== Partners ==
Alliance for Biomedical Research in Europe:

- Alliance for Biomedical Research
- European Brain Council (EBC) (founder member)
- Federation of European Neuroscience Societies (FENS) (founder member)
- International Society for CNS Clinical Trials and Methodology (ISCTM)
