= Joseph Zohar =

Joseph Zohar יוסף זוהר
- Born: 18 April 1948 (age 77)
- Education: Tel Aviv University Sackler School of Medicine, Psychiatry at University of Washington (Seattle) and Jerusalem Mental Health Center
- Known for: Anxiety disorders, depression
- Awards: Fogarty International Research Fellowship Award, ECNP Neuropsychopharmacology Award, A. E. Bennet Award for Clinical Research
- Scientific career
- Fields: Psychiatry
- Institutions: Sheba Medical Center, Tel Aviv University

Joseph Zohar (Hebrew: יוסף זוהר; born 18 April 1948) is the director of Psychiatry and the Anxiety and Obsessive Compulsive Clinic at the Sheba Medical Center in Tel HaShomer and professor of psychiatry at Tel Aviv University, Israel. He is the founder of the World Council on Anxiety as well as the Israeli Consortium on PTSD. He currently leads the chief installation of the Israeli Defense Force for the treatment of PTSD. He was a longtime member of the executive committee of the European College of Neuropsychopharmacology, of which he is a former president, and chairman of the Expert Platform on Mental Health.

== Career ==
=== Research focus/interests ===
Dr. Zohar heads the Anxiety Clinic at Sheba Medical Center, which specializes in anxiety disorders such as obsessive-compulsive disorder, post-traumatic stress disorder, and social phobias. In addition to a focus on new treatments, the clinic is interested in the brain function imaging of patients with these anxiety disorders.

=== Notable contributions to research ===
Zohar is an expert on post-traumatic stress disorder and has uncovered the potential of secondary prevention in PTSD. His work explores the promising effects of hydrocortisone treatment when administered after the traumatic event in preventing the development of PTSD.

=== Past appointments ===
After graduating with his M.D. from Tel Aviv University Sackler School of Medicine, Zohar went on to train in psychiatry at the University of Washington, Seattle, and at the Jerusalem Mental Health Center in Israel. While there, Zohar directed the Resistant Depression Unit.

In 1984, Zohar joined the lab of Dr. Dennis Murphy, at the National Institute of Mental Health in Bethesda, Maryland. He was the acting Director of their Obsessive-Compulsive Clinic.

=== Awards ===
Dr. Zohar has received numerous awards, including the Fogarty International Research Fellowship Award (1984), the A. E. Bennet Award for Clinical Research (1986), the European College of Neuropsychopharmacology Award for Clinical Research (1998), the World Federation of Societies of Biological Psychiatry Award for Excellence in Education (2001), and he is the co-winner of the A.E. Bennett Award for 2002 for a study on an animal model of PTSD.

=== Positions of trust and research assessments ===
Zohar was formerly the chairman of the panel for obsessive-compulsive disorders of the American Psychiatric Association Task Force on Treatments of Psychiatric Disorders (1986). In 1992, he established the World Council on Anxiety, known then as the International Council on Anxiety and OCD, and served as its chairman. He is the chair of the Anxiety and Obsessive Compulsive Disorders section of the World Psychiatric Association (WPA).

Since 1995 Zohar has been a member of the executive committee of the ECNP and chairman of the Israel Society for Biological Psychiatry. In 1996 he was nominated as a member of the WHO Expert Advisory Panel on Neuroscience. In 1997 he was elected to the executive committee of the World Federation of Societies of Biological Psychiatry. He is also chairman of the Brussels-based depression and mental health think-tank, the Expert Platform on Mental Health.

Joseph Zohar is on the editorial board of the World Journal of Biological Psychiatry, the CNS Spectrum and several other journals.

He founded the Israeli consortium on PTSD, is currently the commander of the chief installation of the Israeli Defense Force for treating PTSD, and he is serving as a special advisor to the Ministry of Defense in relation to PTSD.

In 2023, he was named Honorary Member of the European College of Neuropsychopharmacology (ECNP).

== Publications ==
He is the author of more than 400 scientific papers and has edited 18 books focusing on refractory depression, obsessive-compulsive disorder, and PTSD.
