= Edda Sveinsdottir =

Icelandic/Danish computer scientist (1936–2022)

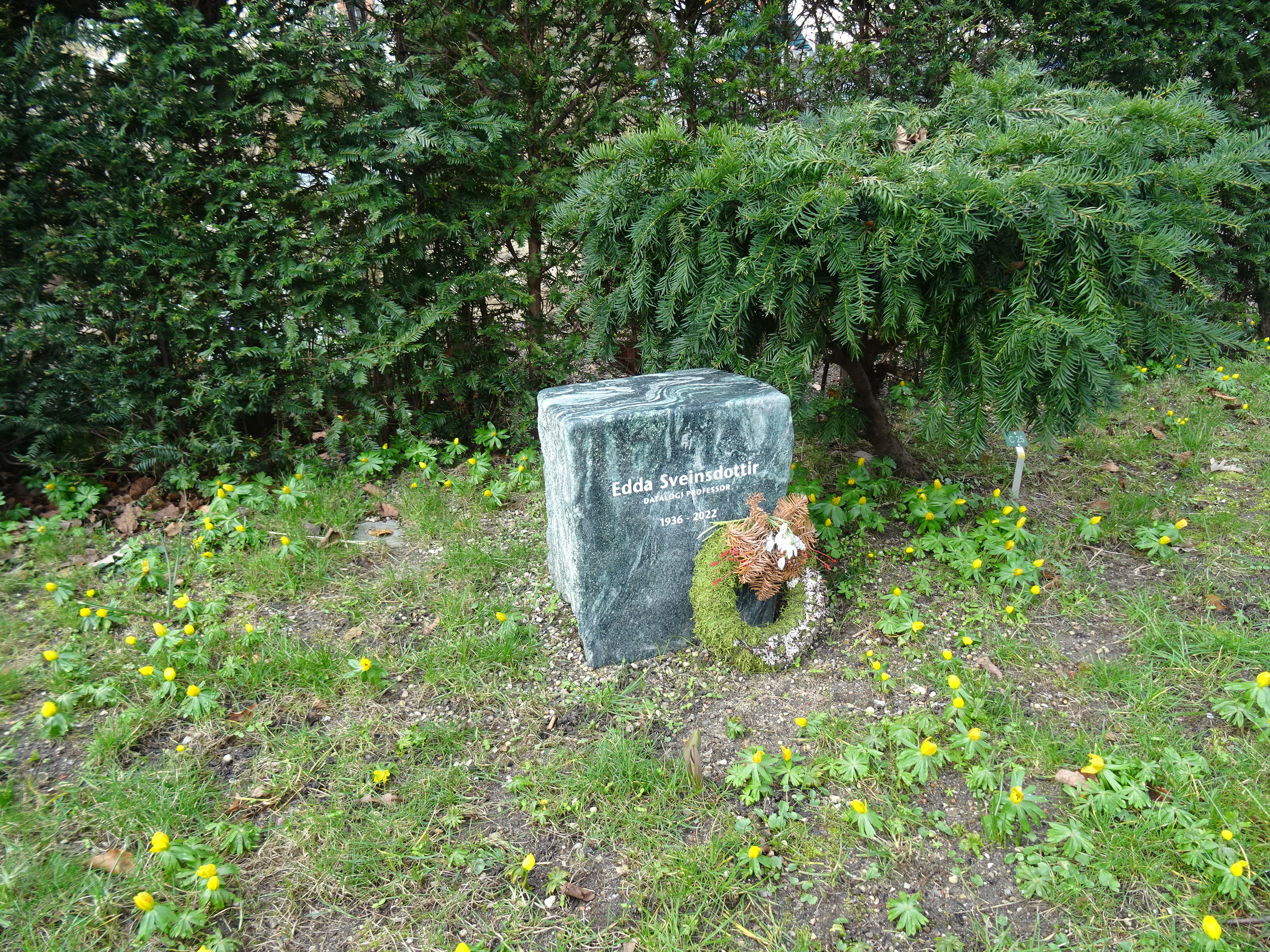
The grave of Edda Sveinsdottir in Copenhagen.

Edda Sveinsdottir (9 April 1936 – 3 April 2022) was an Icelandic-Danish computer scientist, inventor, and professor. She is considered to be the first female Danish computer scientist and was the first (and currently only) female head of department at University of Copenhagen's Department of Computer Science.

== Early life ==
Sveinsdottir was born in 1936 in Reykjavik to Icelandic father, Professor Sveinn Bergsveinsson, and Danish mother, architect Anne Marie Østergaard. Sveinsdottir's parents divorced when she was three years old, and she lived with her mother, grandmother, and three aunts in Denmark, continuing to live much of her life in Denmark.

Sveinsdottir studied at Ordrup Gymnasium, where she met Niels Alexander Lassen. After graduating in 1955, they married the same year and began professional collaboration. After having four sons together, they later divorced, whilst still continuing their professional relationship.

== Career ==
Sveinsdottir began studying mathematics and physics, with numerical analysis as her major, at Copenhagen University in 1958. In 1965 she obtained her master's degree in Mathematics. From 1965 to 1970 she was employed at the Department of Mathematics at Copenhagen University where she worked on the electronic calculator, GIER – Denmark's second ever computer. It was during this time Sveinsdottir was drawn to the newly forming computer environment in Denmark and learned programming at the Technical University of Denmark. When the Department of Computer Science at Copenhagen University was established in 1970, she was appointed as an associate professor and, later, head of department (during 1970-1971 and 1982-1984), making her one of the subject's early pioneers.

Sveinsdottir's field of research has focussed on computer-assisted tomography, a branch of medical technology which uses computers to develop equipment for the imaging of brain activity. She pioneered the use of computers for imaging, rather that for numbers as they had previously been used.

In the mid-1970s, she co-founded the electronics company Medimatic A / S which launched a new type of computer software.

In 1987, Sveinsdottir was made a professor of computer science at Roskilde University Center (RUC). In 1976-78 she was appointed chairperson of the National Academic Committee for the Natural Sciences.

She died on 3 April 2022, at the age of 85.
