= Olaf B. Paulson =

Danish neuroscientist

Olaf Bjarne Paulson (born 22 July 1940 in Copenhagen, Denmark) is a Danish neuroscientist.

Holding an MD (1966) and DMSc (1970) at Copenhagen University, he worked in collaboration with Niels A. Lassen. His research focused on the physiology and pathophysiology of the cerebral circulation and metabolism. In the 1990s the research moved into positron emission tomography (PET) and magnetic resonance (MR). Former Chairman at the Neurology Department at Rigshospitalet (1979-94), he was establisher and leader of the Neurobiology Research Unit in 1995. He has been leading the Magnetic Resonance center at Hvidovre Hospital, Copenhagen, has been chairman of the Department of Clinical Neuroscience and Psychiatry at the University of Copenhagen, and has been chairman of the Danish Neurological Society.
