= Martien Kas =

Dutch neuroscientist

- Born: 27 November 1966 (age 59)
- Education: Ph.D. in Behavioral Neuroscience, Stanford University/University of Groningen
- Known for: Translational and transdiagnostic neuroscience research
- Awards: Marie Curie Fellowship, VIDI grant, Innovative Medicine Initiative
- Scientific career
- Fields: Behavioural Neuroscience
- Institutions: University of Groningen, Groningen, Netherlands

Martien J. H. Kas (born 27 November 1966, Uithoorn) is professor at the Groningen Institute for Evolutionary Life Sciences, University of Groningen, the Netherlands, where he leads the behavioural neuroscience research group. His research aims to develop a quantitative, transdiagnostic and translational neurobiological approach to the understanding of neuropsychiatric disorders in order to accelerate the discovery and development of better treatments. The ability to precisely link neuropsychiatric symptoms to underlying neurobiology will not only facilitate the development of better treatments, it will also allow physicians to provide people living with a neuropsychiatric condition with a better understanding of the complexities and management of their illness.

From 2022-2025, he was the President of the European College of Neuropsychopharmacology (ECNP), the largest European organization for neuroscience applied research. ECNP provides a platform for interactions between scientists, patients and their families, pharmaceutical industry and regulators for optimizing the treatment of brain disorders, and organizes many activities, including an annual congress with 6500-7500 participants. As ECNP President he initiated the Precision Psychiatry Roadmap initiative. The outline of the Roadmap was published in 2025.

== Career ==
Kas received his M.Sc. in biology, with specialization in neurobiology, psychopharmacology, and ethology from the Vrije Universiteit Amsterdam, and a Ph.D. in behavioral neuroscience from Stanford University and the University of Groningen. He completed a postdoctoral fellowship at the University Medical Center Utrecht and was a visiting scientist at the Social, Genetic and Developmental Psychiatry Research Centre at the Institute of Psychiatry (London). He was an associate professor in the Department of Translational Neuroscience, Brain Center Rudolf Magnus, at the University Medical Center Utrecht

By applying interspecies genetic analysis of neurobehavioral traits (in mice and humans), Kas' research aims to identify functional genotype–phenotype relationships relevant to understand neural circuit biology and to the development of etiology-directed treatments and biomarkers for brain disorders, such as Schizophrenia, Major Depressive Disorder, Autism Spectrum Disorder, and Alzheimer's disease.

Kas is currently serving as Past-President of the European College of Neuropsychopharmacology (ECNP) for the term 2025-2028, having previously served as President, President-elect, Secretary and Councilor.

Since 2024, he is also a voting member of the Future Diagnostic and Statistical Manual of Mental Disorders (DSM) Strategic Committee. The Future DSM Strategic Committee's work, detailed in five white papers published in The American Journal of Psychiatry, proposes transforming the manual into a dynamic "living document" using a four-domain diagnostic model that integrates biomarkers, social and environmental determinants, transdiagnostic features, and patient-centered functioning to improve scientific rigor and clinical inclusivity.

== Honors ==
Kas has received a Marie Curie Fellowship as principal investigator. He received a VIDI grant as principal investigator on a project studying interspecies genetics of neurobehavioral traits in mice and men. As project coordinator he was awarded the Innovative Medicines Initiative PRISM1 and PRISM2 projects, a ZonMW memorable project, and co-awarded the Innovative Medicines Initiative projects for Translational Endpoints in Autism (EU-AIMS) and Aims-2-trials.

In 2026, Kas has been appointed as a Scientific Member of the Royal Holland Society of Sciences and Humanities (KHMW). The KHMW is the oldest learned society in the Netherlands. Since its founding in 1752, its mission has been twofold: to advance science in the broadest sense (including the arts) and to build meaningful bridges between academia and society.

== Publications ==
Kas has published extensively, with numerous peer-reviewed articles and book chapters to his name.
