= Scandinavian Journal of Caring Sciences =

- Discipline: Nursing
- Language: English
- Edited by: Päivi Åstedt-Kurki & Marja Kaunonen

Publication details
- History: 1987-present
- Publisher: Wiley-Blackwell
- Frequency: Quarterly
- Impact factor: 1.438 (2016)

Standard abbreviations
- ISO 4: Scand. J. Caring Sci.

Indexing
- CODEN: SJSCEN
- ISSN: 0283-9318 (print); 1471-6712 (web)
- LCCN: 2001242201
- OCLC no.: 909877561

Links
- Journal homepage; Online access; Online archive

The Scandinavian Journal of Caring Sciences is a quarterly peer-reviewed academic journal covering nursing, occupational therapy, and physiotherapy. Established in 1987, it was the first journal covering these topics to be established in the Nordic countries. It is published by John Wiley & Sons on behalf of the Nordic College of Caring Science, of which it is the official journal. The editors-in-chief are Päivi Åstedt-Kurki and Marja Kaunonen (University of Tampere). According to the Journal Citation Reports, the journal has a 2016 impact factor of 1.438, ranking it 30th out of 114 journals in the category "Nursing (Social Science)".
