= Niels A. Lassen =

Danish physician and neurologist (1926–1997)

Niels Alexander Lassen (December 7, 1926 – April 30, 1997) was a Danish nuclear medicine physician, neurologist and pioneer in the fields of neuroimaging, neuropsychiatry and nuclear medicine. He was born and died in Copenhagen.

Lassen has been called the greatest Danish brain researcher since Niels Steensen.

== Career ==
His father, H. C. A. Lassen, was professor at the University of Copenhagen, and Niels Lassen graduated as medical doctor from the same university in 1951. With his colleague Ole Munck he began in the 1950s to use radioactive isotopes for the measurement of the blood circulation in the brain, and in the beginning of the 1960s he together with David H. Ingvar from University of Lund began the development of methods for regional measurements on the brain with krypton-85 and xenon-133 isotopes. These efforts were summarized in a Scientific American article in 1978.

He was employed at Bispebjerg Hospital in 1958 to 1996. From 1963 he established and lead the department of Clinical Physiology. He wrote 710 scientific publications in the period 1954-2000+. He was married to Edda Sveinsdottir who as a computer scientist helped with the development of the (at that time) advanced computer technology for image construction of the regional brain measurements.

== The Niels Lassen Award ==
The Niels Lassen Award is presented by the International Society for Cerebral Blood Flow and Metabolism (ISCBFM). The Danish medical doctor, brain researcher and "science entertainer" Peter Lund Madsen was a student of Niels A. Lassen, and Peter Lund Madsen received the Niels A. Lassen Prize in 2002.

Previous recipients have included :

- 1999 - Matthias Endres, Mass. General Hospital, Harvard University, Boston, USA and the Exp. Neurology, Charite, Humboldt University, Berlin, Germany
- 2001 - Sylvain Doré, Departments of Anesthesiology/Critical Care Medicine and Neuroscience, Johns Hopkins School of Medicine, Baltimore, Maryland, USA
- 2003 - Fahmeed Hyder, Department of Diagnostic Radiology, Yale University, New Haven, CT, USA
- 2005 - Kirsten Caesar, Department of Medical Physiology, Copenhagen University, Copenhagen, Denmark
- 2007 - Kazuhiko Hayashi, Osaka University Graduate School of Medicine, Suita, Osaka, Japan
- 2009 - Alyson A. Miller, Monash University, Melbourne, Australia
- 2011 - Virginia Newcombe, University of Cambridge, Cambridge, UK
- 2013 - Peiying Li, Fudan University, Shanghai, China
- 2015 - Sjoerd Finnema, Yale University, New Haven, CT, USA

Lassen himself received The Novo Nordisk Prize in 1968, from the Novo Nordisk Foundation, and was the first recipient of the inaugural International Society for Cerebral Blood Flow and Metabolism (ISCBFM) Lifetime Achievement Award in 1997.

== Bibliography ==
- Niels A. Lassen, William A. Perl, Tracer kinetic methods in medical physiology, Raven, New York City, 1979. ISBN 0-89004-114-8.
- Olaf B. Paulson, "Niels A. Lassen (1926-1997)", In Festskrift. Dansk Neurologisk Selskab 1900-2000, Jørgen Therkelsen(editor), Lægeforeningens forlag, Copenhagen, 2000.
- Lars Friberg; Albert Gjedde (September 1997). "In memoriam: Niels A. Lassen, 7 December 1926 - 30 April 1997". European Journal of Nuclear Medicine. 24 (9): 1083–1084. doi:10.1007/BF01254237. S2CID 6330282.
- Olaf B. Paulson (1997). "Niels A. Lassen, M.D., Ph.D.: 1926–1997". Journal of Cerebral Blood Flow & Metabolism. 17 (10): 1005–1006. doi:10.1097/00004647-199710000-00001.
