= Journal of Cerebral Blood Flow & Metabolism =

- Discipline: Cerebral blood flow, brain metabolism, neuroimaging
- Language: English
- Edited by: Jun Chen

Publication details
- History: 1981–present
- Publisher: SAGE Publications
- Frequency: Monthly
- Open access: Delayed, after 2 years
- Impact factor: 6.200 (2020)

Standard abbreviations
- ISO 4: J. Cereb. Blood Flow Metab.

Indexing
- CODEN: JCBMDN
- ISSN: 0271-678X (print); 1559-7016 (web)
- LCCN: 81642753
- OCLC no.: 859674545

Links
- Journal homepage

The Journal of Cerebral Blood Flow & Metabolism is a monthly peer-reviewed medical journal the official journal of the International Society for Cerebral Blood Flow & Metabolism and publishes peer-reviewed research and review papers. covering research on experimental, theoretical, and clinical aspects of brain circulation, metabolism and imaging. The editor-in-chief is Jun Chen (University of Pittsburgh). According to the Journal Citation Reports, the journal has a 2020 impact factor of 6.200.
