= 1958 in aviation =

This is a list of aviation-related events from 1958.

== Events ==
- For the first time, the total of transatlantic passengers carried by air this year exceeded the total carried by sea.
- Gulfstream Aerospace was founded in Savannah, Georgia, United States.
- The Argentine Navy acquired its first aircraft carrier by purchasing HMS Warrior from the United Kingdom.
- The Brazilian Navy acquired aircraft of its own for the first time since the 1941 creation of the Brazilian Air Force, purchasing two Bell 47-J and three Westland Widgeon helicopters.

=== January ===
- January 1
  - During a revolt against Venezuelan President Marcos Pérez Jiménez, rebel Venezuelan Air Force de Havilland Venom, de Havilland Vampire, and F-86 Sabre aircraft attacked Miraflores Palace, the defense ministry, and other military targets in the Caracas area.
  - As a cost-saving measure, the United States Air Force (USAF) inactivated the Eighteenth Air Force and reassigned its forces to the Twelfth Air Force.
- January 14 – Qantas became the first foreign airline permitted to fly across the United States.
- January 26 – British European Airways (BEA) takes over all operation of Cyprus Airways routes, although Cyprus Airways continues to operate under its own name.
- January 31 – While a U.S. Air Force Boeing B-47 Stratojet made a simulated takeoff in Morocco, a wheel casting failure caused its tail assembly to strike the runway. One of the bomber's fuel tanks ruptured, and a fire broke out that damaged an armed nuclear bomb aboard the aircraft, releasing some radioactive material into the environment.

=== February ===
- February 1 – United Airlines sets a record commercial Honolulu, Hawaii-to-Los Angeles, California, flight time of 6 hours 21 minutes.
- February 5 – Two USAF aircraft – a B-47B Stratojet and an F-86 Sabre – collided in midair over the Atlantic Ocean off the coast of Georgia in the United States. The F-86 crashed after its pilot ejected, but the B-47B remained airborne, jettisoned a Mark 15 hydrogen bomb into Wassaw Sound off Tybee Island, Georgia, and made an emergency landing at Hunter Army Airfield in Savannah, Georgia. The bomb has not been recovered.
- February 6 – The British European Airways Airspeed Ambassador G-ALZU Lord Burghley, operating as Flight 609, crashed on its third attempt to take off from a slush-covered runway at Munich-Riem Airport in West Germany, killing 23, including eight Manchester United footballers.
- February 11 – Mohawk Airlines hired Ruth Carol Taylor as the first African American flight attendant in history. Six months later, Mohawk fired her for getting married, a common airline industry practice at the time.
- February 13 – A British Ministry of Defence White Paper made Britain's nuclear weapons programme public knowledge.
- February 16 – Eight hijackers commandeered a Korean National Airlines Douglas DC-3 with 34 people on board during a domestic flight in South Korea from Busan to Seoul and forced it to fly to Pyongyang, North Korea.
- February 25 – United Airlines set a speed record for a commercial flight from Honolulu, Hawaii, to San Francisco, California, with a flight time of 5 hours 43 minutes.
- February 27 – The Silver City Airways Bristol 170 Freighter G-AICS, travelling from Ronaldsway Airport, Ballasalla, on the Isle of Man to Ringway Airport in Manchester, England, crashed into Winter Hill, Rivington Moor, Lancashire, in North West England in bad weather, killing 35 of the 42 people on board and injuring all seven survivors.

=== March ===
- South Vietnam's Republic of Vietnam Air Force took delivery of its first helicopters.
- Misrair, the future EgyptAir, renamed itself United Arab Airlines. Egypt and Syria's merger on 1 February to form the United Arab Republic prompted the name change.
- March 6 – Southwest Airways renamed itself Pacific Air Lines.
- March 11 – A crewman aboard a USAF B-47E Stratojet flying as part of a formation of four B-47s from Hunter Air Force Base in Savannah, Georgia, to England to conduct a mock bombing attack in Operation Snow Flurry accidentally released a 7,600 lb (3,400 kg) Mark 6 nuclear bomb at an altitude of 15,000 ft (4,600 m). The bomb smashed the closed bomb bay doors open and struck the ground in Mars Bluff, South Carolina. Its high-explosive detonator exploded on impact, creating a crater 70 ft (21 m) wide and 30 ft (9.1 m) deep. The bomb's core was not in the weapon, so no nuclear explosion occurred.
- March 15 – German-born American pilot Peter Gluckmann, dubbed "The Flying Watchmaker" by the press, takes off from San Francisco, California, in the Beechcraft Bonanza City of San Francisco to attempt a counterclockwise flight by light plane to South America, Africa, and Europe, and then across North America to San Francisco.
- March 16 – Air Inter commenced operations.
- March 22 – Lucky Liz, the private twin-engined Lockheed Lodestar of American theater and film producer Mike Todd, flying grossly overloaded in fog, snow, and thunderstorms, crashed in the Zuni Mountains near Grants, New Mexico, when one of its engines failed in icing conditions. All four people aboard the plane died, including Todd and his biographer, American sportswriter, screenwriter, and author Art Cohn. Todd's wife, American actress Elizabeth Taylor, was not aboard because she had stayed home with a bout of bronchitis.

=== April ===
- The Handley Page Victor strategic bomber began to enter squadron service with the Royal Air Force.
- April 6 – Vickers Viscount N7437, operating as Capital Airlines Flight 67, stalled and crashed into Saginaw Bay near Freeland, Michigan, while on approach to Freeland-Tri City Airport in Saginaw. All 47 people aboard died. The cause was attributed to ice accretion on the horizontal stabilizer.
- April 9 – A Cubana de Aviación Vickers Viscount with 13 people on board was hijacked during a domestic flight in Cuba from Havana to Santa Clara and forced to fly to Mérida, Yucatán, Mexico.
- April 10 – A rebellious Republic of Korea Air Force (ROKAF) captain attempted to hijack a ROKAF Curtiss C-46 Commando with seven people on board during a domestic flight in South Korea from Daegu to Seoul and forced it to fly him to North Korea. A struggle ensued in which the hijacker shot one of the crew members to death, but he was subdued and the plane diverted to a landing at Pyongtaek, South Korea.
- April 13 – The three crew members of a Cubana de Aviación Douglas DC-3 with 12 passengers on board making a domestic flight in Cuba from Havana to Santa Clara illegally flew the airliner to Miami, Florida, instead, to seek refuge in the United States.
- April 21 – United Airlines Flight 736, a Douglas DC-7 bound for Denver, Colorado, collided at 21,000 ft (6,400 m) with a USAF F-100 Super Sabre fighter on a training mission near Las Vegas, Nevada. All 47 persons aboard the airliner and both F-100 crew members were killed.
- April 28
  - A B-26 Invader bomber flown by U.S. Central Intelligence Agency employee William H. Beale in support of Indonesian Permesta rebels bombed the harbor at Balikpapan, Borneo, Indonesia, sinking the British oil tanker SS San Flaviano and hitting the British oil tanker MV Daronia with a 500 lb (230 kg) bomb that bounced overboard without exploding. In June, the Indonesian and British governments both claimed that Indonesian rebels flew the bomber, concealing the CIA's involvement.
  - Aerlínte Éireann, a division of Aer Lingus, made the first transatlantic flight by an Irish airline, using a Lockheed L-1049 Super Constellation for a flight from Shannon to New York City.

=== May ===
- May 7 – USAF Major Howard C. Johnson of the 83rd Fighter Interceptor Squadron set a new world record for altitude, flying a Lockheed F-104 Starfighter to 27,813 m (91,250 ft).
- May 16 – USAF Captain Walter W. Irwin set a new world airspeed record of 1,404 mph (2,260 km/h) in an F-104 Starfighter, the first record over 2,000 km/h (1,200 mph).
- May 11 – German-born American pilot Peter Gluckmann, dubbed "The Flying Watchmaker" by the press, reluctantly leaves his Beechcraft Bonanza City of San Francisco behind in Reno, Nevada, and completes his 57-day four-continent solo flight from San Francisco, California, by returning to San Francisco via commercial airliner. Nonetheless, he has flown from San Francisco southward down the length of South America, then from Brazil to Africa and from there to Europe before flying to Iceland and then to Goose Bay, Labrador, and across North America to Reno. During his flight he has visited 26 countries and made his fourth crossing of the North Atlantic Ocean, all in light planes. He also has become the first pilot to fly solo in a light plane westbound across the South Atlantic Ocean in a flight from Recife, Brazil, to Dakar, French West Africa — his second crossing of the South Atlantic, both in light planes — the first pilot to fly solo 2,000 miles (3,200 km) across the Sahara in a light plane, and the first pilot to make a nonstop solo flight in a light plane from Iceland to North America, flying from Keflavik to Goose Bay on a polar route passing over Greenland.
- May 17 – Four F3H Demons and four F8U Crusaders made a nonstop crossing of the Atlantic Ocean.
- May 18
  - Indonesian forces shot down a B-26 Invader bomber flown by U.S. Central Intelligence Agency (CIA) employee Allen Pope in support of Indonesian Permesta rebels and captured Pope. In June, the Indonesian and British governments both claimed that Indonesian rebels flew the bomber, concealing the CIA's involvement.
  - In a zero-length launch (ZEL) experiment, a USAF North American F-100D Super Sabre became airborne with no runway or take-off roll at all, using its own engine in afterburner and boosted by a 130,000-pound (59,000 kg)-thrust Astrodyne rocket.
- May 20 – Vickers Viscount N7410 of Capital Airlines collided in midair with a Lockheed T-33 Shooting Star of the Air National Guard. All 11 on board the Viscount were killed when it crashed at Brunswick, Maryland, as was one of the two crew members of the T-33.
- May 22–23 – Flying a Douglas F4D-1 Skyray, United States Marine Corps Major N. LeFaivre broke five world climb-to-height records, including 15,000 m (49,000 ft) in 2 minutes 36 seconds.
- May 25 – A Dan-Air Avro 685 York C.1 cargo aircraft suffered an in-flight engine fire and crashed during a forced landing near Gurgaon, Haryana, India, killing four of the five-person crew.
- May 26 – The Short SC.1 experimental VTOL aircraft made its first (tethered) vertical flight, in the United Kingdom.

=== June ===
- June 2 – Shortly after take-off from Guadalajara Airport in Guadalajara, Mexico, for a flight to Mexico City, Aeronaves de México Flight 111, a Lockheed L-749A Constellation (registration XA-MEV), crashed into La Latilla Mountain, 16 km (9.9 mi) from Guadalajara Airport, killing all 45 people on board in what at the time is the deadliest aviation accident in Mexican history. Two prominent American scientists – oceanographer Townsend Cromwell and fisheries scientist Bell M. Shimada – were among the dead. The postaccident investigation found that the airliner's crew did not follow the established climb-out procedure for the airport after taking off.
- June 9 – London Gatwick Airport opened after two years of extensive reconstruction. It was the first multimodal airport in the world, with direct rail connections from the main terminal to London and Brighton.
- June 26 – A Grumman TF-1 Trader of U.S. Navy Air Transport Squadron 21 carried a Westinghouse J34 jet engine from San Diego, California, on a 300-mile (483-km) flight to the antisubmarine warfare carrier USS Yorktown (CVS-10), then at sea in the Pacific Ocean. It was the first delivery of an aircraft engine via carrier onboard delivery.
- June 28 – The 22-year operational career of the Avro Anson cane to an end with a six-plane formation fly-over of their base by the Southern Communications Squadron at Bovington, Hampshire, United Kingdom.

=== July ===
- Royal Air Maroc initiated a number of long-haul routes using four Lockheed L-749 Constellations leased from Air France. The arrival of the Constellations allowed the airline to withdraw its Douglas DC-4s from long-haul service.
- July 1 – Royal Nepal Airlines was founded. Initially, its fleet consisted of a single Douglas DC-3.
- July 3 – The "Telecopter", a Bell Model 47 rented by television station KTLA in Los Angeles, and outfitted with a television camera, made the world's first flight by a television news helicopter. Its inventor, John D. Silva, was aboard. When the television station reported that it was receiving no video, Silva exited the helicopter's cockpit to climb onto its landing skid while it hovered at 1,500 ft (460 m) so he could investigate the microwave transmitter bolted to its side, where he discovered that a vacuum tube had failed due to vibration and hot weather. After Silva fixed the problem overnight, the Telecopter made its first successful news flight the following day.
- July 11 – A United States Air Force Boeing KC-135 Stratotanker makes the first nonstop flight from Washington, D.C., to Honolulu, Hawaii. The flight takes 11 hours 8 minutes.
- July 15–16 – Aircraft from the United States Navy aircraft carrier USS Essex (CVA-9) covered United States Army and U.S. Marine Corps landings in Lebanon in Operation Blue Bat, the American intervention in the 1958 Lebanon crisis. Air support began with a flight by 50 Essex jets over Beirut on July 15.
- July 29 – President Dwight D. Eisenhower signed the National Aeronautics and Space Act, disestablishing the National Advisory Committee on Aeronautics and creating the National Aeronautics and Space Administration, both effective October 1, 1958.
- July 31–August 1 – Pat Boling sets a nonstop distance record for light planes, flying the Beechcraft J-35 Bonanza Philippine Bonanza across the Pacific Ocean from Manila in the Philippines to Pendleton, Oregon. The 45.4-hour flight covers 6,856 miles (11,034 km).

=== August ===
- Pacific Southwest Airlines inaugurated service to Los Angeles International Airport.
- August 9 – Central African Airways Flight 890, a Vickers Viscount airliner, crashed near Benina International Airport outside Benghazi, Libya, killing 36 of the 54 people on board. It was the deadliest aviation accident in Libyan history at the time.
- August 14 – The KLM Lockheed Super Constellation Hugo de Groot (PH-LKM) crashed in the Atlantic Ocean 180 km (110 mi) west of Shannon Airport, Ireland, perhaps due to mechanical failure, killing all 99 on board. Six members of Egypt's national fencing team were among the dead.
- August 23
  - The Second Taiwan Strait Crisis began with People's Republic of China artillery forces shelling the Nationalist Chinese-held islands of Quemoy and Matsu. During the crisis, the U.S. Navy attack aircraft carriers USS Midway (CVA-41) and USS Lexington (CVA-16) patrolled nearby, and F8U Crusader fighters from them made 1,000-knot (1,150-mph; 1,852-km/h) sweeps along the coast of China.
  - President Dwight D. Eisenhower signed the Federal Aviation Act of 1958, dissolving the Civil Aeronautics Administration and Civil Aeronautics Board and transferring all authority over aviation operations in the United States to the newly created Federal Aviation Agency (later renamed Federal Aviation Administration).

=== September ===
- September 2 – An Independent Air Travel Vickers VC.1 Viking cargo aircraft carrying two Bristol Proteus turboprop engines suffered engine trouble soon after takeoff from London Heathrow Airport. While attempting to reach Blackbushe Airport for an emergency landing, the Viking crashed into a row of houses in Southall, London, killing its entire crew of three and a mother and three children on the ground.
- September 5 – One or more hijackers attempted to commandeer an Aeroflot Ilyushin Il-14P with 17 people on board during a domestic flight in the Soviet Union from Leningrad to Tallinn. Passengers overpowered the hijacker or hijackers, one person died in the struggle, and the airliner diverted to a landing at Jõhvi.
- September 6 – The U.S. Joint Chiefs of Staff recommended that U.S. Navy forces be given permission for more aggressive action the Second Taiwan Strait Crisis, including carrier air strikes against the territory of the People's Republic of China, but President Dwight D. Eisenhower rejects the idea.
- September 10 – After takeoff from Abadan, Iran, a Netherlands Naval Aviation Service Martin PBM-5A Mariner (P-303) developed an engine oil leak. The crew shut down the engine and attempted to return to Abadan Airport, but the plane lost altitude and crashed, killing all 10 people aboard, when the remaining engine went into reverse thrust.
- September 18 – East Germany established the airline Interflug as a hedge against its national airline, Deutsche Lufthansa (DLH), losing a trademark lawsuit to the West German airline Lufthansa, which in August 1954 had purchased the right to use the name of the defunct pre-1945 German airline Deutsche Luft Hansa. Pending legal developments, Interflug operated as a charter airline until taking over DLH's assets upon the liquidation of DLH in September 1963.
- September 20 – During a high-speed flyby in an air show at RAF Syerston, Nottinghamshire, England, a prototype Avro Vulcan bomber (serial number VX770) suffered total collapse of the starboard wing and crashed, killing its entire crew and three people on the ground.
- September 24 – During the Second Taiwan Strait Crisis, a dogfight broke out between 32 Republic of China Air Force F-86F Sabres and over 100 People's Republic of China MiG aircraft. During the engagement, guided air-to-air missiles were employed in combat for the first time when the Sabres used AAM-N-7 Sidewinder IA – later known as AIM-9B Sidewinder IA – missiles to down several MiG-15 (NATO reporting name "Fagot") fighters and at least 10 MiG-17s (NATO reporting name "Fresco").
- September 30 – Britain's last flying boat was withdrawn from commercial service when Aquila Airways terminated its service on the Southampton-Funchal (Madeira) route.

=== October ===
- October 1 – In the United States, in accordance with the National Aeronautics and Space Act of 1958, the National Advisory Committee on Aeronautics was dissolved and its successor, the National Aeronautics and Space Administration, began operations.
- October 4 – BOAC de Havilland Comet 4 G-APDB made the first commercial transatlantic crossing by a jet airliner, from London Heathrow Airport to New York International Airport, Anderson Field via Gander.
- October 8 – In Manhigh III, the third and final flight of the USAF's Project Manhigh, Lieutenant Clifton M. McClure ascended to an altitude of 29,900 m (98,100 ft) in a helium balloon, the second-highest altitude achieved in Manhigh.
- October 10 – A C-123B Provider serving as a maintenance support aircraft for the United States Air Force Thunderbirds air demonstration team flew into a flock of birds and crashed near Payette, Idaho, killing the entire flight crew of five and all 14 maintenance personnel on board. It remains the worst accident in Thunderbirds history.
- October 15 – The first North American X-15 was rolled out at North American Aviation's facility at Los Angeles.
- October 19 – A People's Republic of China-owned Tupolev Tu-104 crashed at Kanash in the Soviet Union during a regular flight between Beijing and Moscow, killing all 65 passengers and crew members. Among those killed were 16 Chinese government officials, one Briton, four East Germans, and the son of the Cambodian ambassador to China.
- October 22
  - The Vickers Viscount 701 G-ANHC, operating as British European Airways Flight 142, collided with an Italian Air Force F-86E Sabre over Anzio, Italy. Both aircraft crashed; the F-86E pilot ejected and survived, but all 31 people aboard the Viscount died.
  - Three rebels hijacked a Cubana de Aviación Douglas DC-3 with 14 people on board during a domestic flight in Cuba from Cayo Mambi to Moa, and forced it land at a rebel-held airfield in the Sierra Maestra mountain range in southeastern Cuba.
- October 25 – The Short SC.1 experimental VTOL aircraft made its first free vertical flight.
- October 26
  - Snowy Mountains Scheme worker Tom Sonter accidentally discovered the wreckage of the Australian National Airways Avro 618 Ten Southern Cloud, which had disappeared without trace in bad weather over the Snowy Mountains in New South Wales, Australia, with the loss of all eight people on board on March 21, 1931, in Australia's first airline disaster.
  - The first commercial flight by a Boeing 707 jet airliner took place on Pan American World Airways transatlantic service from New York City to Paris.

=== November ===
- Trans-Pacific Airlines changed its name to Aloha Airlines.
- November 4 – Shortly after take-off from Dyess Air Force Base outside Abilene, Texas, a USAF B-47 Stratojet carrying a nuclear bomb caught fire. It reached an altitude of 1,500 ft (460 m) before it crashed, killing one of its four crewmen. High-explosive material in the bomb exploded, creating a crater 6 ft (1.8 m) deep and 35 ft (11 m) in diameter, but no nuclear explosion occurred.
- November 6 – Rebels hijacked a Cubana de Aviación Douglas DC-3 with 29 people on board during a domestic flight in Cuba from Manzanillo to Holguín and forced it land at a rebel-held airfield in Cuba.
- November 9 – The ARTOP Linhas Aéreas PBM-5 Mariner Porto Santo (CS-THB), captained by Harry Frank Broadbent, sends the message "QUG," meaning "I am forced to land immediately," during a flight from Cabo Ruivo Seaplane Base near Lisbon, Portugal, to Funchal on Madeira Island, then disappears. Searchers find no trace of the plane or the 36 people on board.
- November 25 – The English Electric P.1B, the first fully developed prototype of the English Electric Lightning, exceeded Mach 2 for the first time.
- November 26 – A USAF B-47 Stratojet with a nuclear bomb aboard was destroyed by fire while on the ground at Chennault Air Force Base near Lake Charles, Louisiana. High-explosive material in the bomb detonated, contaminating the bomber's wreckage and the surrounding area with radioactivity, but with no nuclear explosion.

=== December ===
- An operational UK Royal Navy fighter squadron fired air-to-air missiles for the first time, when three de Havilland Sea Venoms of No. 893 Squadron, Fleet Air Arm, embarked aboard the aircraft carrier HMS Victorious fired Firestreak missiles at target drones over the Mediterranean Sea off Malta, scoring 80% hits.
- December 4 – Flying a Cessna 172 Skyhawk (registration N9172B), Robert Timm and John Cook took off from McCarran Airfield in Las Vegas. They remained airborne continuously for 64 days, 22 hours, 19 minutes, and 5 seconds before landing at McCarran Airfield on February 4, 1959, setting a new world record for manned flight endurance.
- December 10 – National Airlines became the first airline to offer jet service on domestic flights within the United States, using a Boeing 707 leased from Pan American World Airways for flights between Miami and New York City.
- December 18 – A Bell XV-3 Tiltrotor made the first true midair transition from vertical helicopter-type flight to fully level fixed-wing flight.
- December 23 – Syrian Airways merged into United Arab Airlines (the future EgyptAir). United Arab Airlines took over all of Syrian Airways' routes and aircraft.
- December 24 – During a test flight to renew its certificate of airworthiness, the BOAC Bristol Britannia 312 G-AOVD crashed near Sopley and Winkton, England, killing 9 of the 12 people on board and injuring all three survivors.

== First flights ==
=== January ===
- January 17– Aviamilano Nibbio
- January 19 – Fuji T-1
- January 20 – Nord 3400
- January 25 – Aer Lualdi L.55
- January 31 – North American T2J-1, first variant of the T2J Buckeye, redesignated as the T-2 Buckeye in September 1962

=== February ===
- February 22 – Auster Workmaster
- February 25 – Doak VZ-4

=== March ===
- March 5 – Yakovlev Yak-28
- March 11 – Handley Page Dart Herald
- March 15 – Antonov An-14
- March 25 – Avro CF-105 Arrow RL201 at Malton, Toronto, Ontario, Canada
- March 27 – Aerfer Ariete

=== April ===
- April 17 – LIPNUR Belalang
- April 22 – Boeing Vertol 107-II
- April 24 – SIPA S.1100
- April 30 – Blackburn Buccaneer XK 486

=== May ===
- May 2 – Kaman K-17
- May 12
  - Dassault Mirage IIIA
  - Morane-Saulnier M.S. 1500 Epervier
- May 21
  - Dassault Étendard IVM
  - Breguet 940
  - PZL-102 Kos
- May 27 – McDonnell XF4H-1, prototype of the F-4 Phantom II
- May 30 – Douglas DC-8

=== June ===
- June 2 – Vought XF8U-3 Crusader III, the "Super Crusader"
- June 5 – Sud Aviation SE-116 Voltigeur
- June 9 – Agusta AZ8-L
- June 15 – Westland Westminster
- June 20 – Westland Wessex
- June 26 – PZL M-2

=== July ===
- July 4 – SAN Jodel D.140 Mousquetaire
- July 5 – Bristol Belvedere
- July 8 – Borgward Kolibri
- July 20 – Saro P.531
- July 30 – de Havilland Canada DHC-4 Caribou CF-KTK-X

=== August ===
- August 14 – Grumman Gulfstream I
- August 28 – Beechcraft Queen Air Model 65
- August 31 – North American A3J-1 Vigilante

=== September ===
- September 16 – North American NA265-40 Sabreliner
- September 24
  - Beijing 1
  - HAL Pushpak

=== November ===
- Adams-Wilson Hobbycopter
- November 6 – Downer Bellanca 260

=== December ===
- December 4 – Baade B-152 V1 Prototype
- December 12 – Dornier Do 29
- December 17 – Wassmer WA-30 Bijave
- December 25 – Sukhoi Su-11 (NATO reporting name "Fishpot-C")

== Entered service ==
- Beriev Be-10 (NATO reporting name "Mallow") with the 2nd Squadron of Soviet Naval Aviation's 977th Independent Naval Long-range Reconnaissance Air Regiment

=== January ===
- January 26 – Lockheed F-104 Starfighter with the USAF's 83rd Fighter Interceptor Squadron at Hamilton Air Force Base, California.

=== April ===
- April 9 – Handley Page Victor with the Royal Air Force's No. 10 Squadron at RAF Cottesmore
- April 21 – Vertol Model 44 with New York Airways

=== May ===
- Canadair CL-28 Argus with the Royal Canadian Air Force′s No. 405 Squadron
- May 26 – Republic F-105B Thunderchief with the USAF's 335th Tactical Fighter Squadron at Eglin Air Force Base

=== June ===
- Supermarine Scimitar with 803 Naval Air Squadron, Fleet Air Arm

=== August ===
- Boeing 707 with Pan American World Airways

=== November ===
- November 3 – de Havilland Sea Vixen to 700 Naval Air Squadron

=== December ===
- Lockheed L-188 Electra with American Airlines

== Retirements ==
- Curtiss P-40, by the Brazilian Air Force

=== April ===
- April 16 – Convair R3Y Tradewind by United States Navy Transport Squadron 2
- April 22 – Westland Wyvern by 813 Naval Air Squadron, Fleet Air Arm, Royal Navy

=== June ===
- June 28 – Avro Anson by the Southern Communications Squadron

== Deadliest crash ==
The deadliest crash of this year was KLM Flight 607-E, a Lockheed Super Constellation, which crashed into the Atlantic Ocean west of Galway, Ireland, on 14 August, killing all 99 people on board.
