= List of military nuclear accidents =

This article lists notable military accidents involving nuclear material. Civilian accidents are listed at List of civilian nuclear accidents. For a general discussion of both civilian and military accidents, see nuclear and radiation accidents. For other lists, see Lists of nuclear disasters and radioactive incidents.

== Scope of this article ==
In listing military nuclear accidents, the following criteria have been adopted:

1. There must be well-attested and substantial health risks associated with nuclear materials; or, it must involve nuclear weapons (even if lacking an installed fissile core or if nuclear detonation was not possible).
2. To qualify as "military", the nuclear operation/material must mainly be for military purposes.
3. To qualify as "accident", the damage should not be intentional, unlike in nuclear warfare.

This list may be incomplete due to military secrecy.

== 1940s ==
| Date | Location | Type | Description |
|---|---|---|---|
| June 23, 1942 | Leipzig, Nazi Germany | Steam explosion and reactor fire | Leipzig L-IV experiment accident: Shortly after the Leipzig L-IV atomic pile – worked on by Werner Heisenberg and Robert Doepel – demonstrated Germany's first signs of neutron propagation, the device was checked for a possible heavy water leak. During the inspection, air leaked in, igniting the uranium powder inside. The burning uranium boiled the water jacket, generating enough steam pressure to blow the reactor apart. Burning uranium powder scattered throughout the lab causing a larger fire at the facility. |
| February 11, 1945 | Los Alamos National Laboratory, Los Alamos, New Mexico, United States | Accidental criticality | During an experiment with the Dragon machine (a "fast burst" criticality experiment designed by Otto Frisch), uranium hydride cubes were used in increasingly larger amounts. During the final experiment, 10^{15} fissions were produced, blistering and swelling the cubes by approximately 1/8th of an inch. No personnel were injured. |
| June 6, 1945 | Los Alamos National Laboratory, Los Alamos, New Mexico, United States | Accidental criticality | A pseudosphere of 35.4 kg of highly enriched uranium (enriched to an average of 79.2% U-235) was put inside of a polyethylene box, and the box put into a tank that was filled with water. Before the tank was filled, the system unexpectedly went critical. An estimated 3-4×10^{16} fissions occurred and the temperature of the metal may have risen to 200 °C. Several personnel were exposed to non-lethal amounts of radiation, and the material was re-used for experiments within days. |
| August 21, 1945 | Los Alamos National Laboratory, Los Alamos, New Mexico, United States | Accidental criticality | Harry Daghlian dropped a tungsten carbide brick onto a plutonium core, inadvertently creating a critical mass at the Los Alamos Omega site. He quickly removed the brick, but was fatally irradiated, and died on September 15. |
| May 21, 1946 | Los Alamos National Laboratory, Los Alamos, New Mexico, United States | Accidental criticality | A sketch of Louis Slotin's criticality accident used to determine exposure of those in the room at the time. While demonstrating his technique to visiting scientists at Los Alamos, Canadian physicist Louis Slotin manually assembled a critical mass of plutonium. A momentary slip of a screwdriver caused a prompt critical reaction. Slotin died on May 30 from massive radiation poisoning, with an estimated dose of 1,000 rads (rad), or 10 grays (Gy). Seven observers, who received doses as high as 166 rads, survived, yet three died within a few decades from conditions believed to be radiation-related. Slotin worked with the same bomb core as Daghlian which became known as the "demon core." It was later melted down and combined with existing weapons-grade material. |

== 1950s ==
| Date | Location | Type | Description |
|---|---|---|---|
| February 13, 1950 | British Columbia, Canada | Non-nuclear detonation of an atomic bomb | Main article: 1950 British Columbia B-36 crash A USAF B-36 bomber was flying a simulated combat mission from Eielson Air Force Base, near Fairbanks, Alaska, to Carswell Air Force Base in Fort Worth, Texas, carrying a Mark 4 nuclear bomb (minus a fissile core). After six hours of flight, the bomber experienced mechanical problems and was forced to shut down three of its six engines at an altitude of 12,000 feet (3,700 m). Fearing that severe weather and icing would jeopardize a safe emergency landing, the weapon was jettisoned over the Pacific Ocean from a height of 8,000 ft (2,400 m). The weapon's high explosives detonated upon impact with a bright flash visible. All of the sixteen crew members and one passenger were able to parachute from the plane and twelve were subsequently rescued from Princess Royal Island. The accident was categorized as a Broken Arrow, that is an accident involving a nuclear weapon but which does not present a risk of war. |
| April 11, 1950 | Albuquerque, New Mexico, US | Non-nuclear detonation of an atomic bomb | Three minutes after departure from Kirtland Air Force Base in Albuquerque a USAF Boeing B-29 Superfortress carrying a Mark 4 nuclear bomb (minus a fissile core), four spare detonators, and a crew of thirteen crashed into a mountain near Manzano Base. The crash resulted in a fire that The New York Times reported as being visible from 15 miles (24 km). The bomb's casing was demolished and its high explosives ignited upon contact with the plane's burning fuel. However, according to the Department of Defense, the four spare detonators and all nuclear components, including a "dummy capsule" simulating a nuclear core, were recovered. All thirteen crew members died. |
| July 13, 1950 | Lebanon, Ohio, US | Non-nuclear detonation of an atomic bomb | A USAF B-50 aircraft on a training mission from Biggs Air Force Base with a Mark 4 nuclear bomb (minus a fissile core) flew into the ground resulting in a high-explosive detonation, but no nuclear explosion. The cause of the accident could not be established; the aircraft gave no signals of distress, and was flying on a clear day, but simply went into a steep dive and crashed nose-first, killing four officers and twelve airmen. |
| August 5, 1950 | Fairfield-Suisun AFB, California, US | Non-nuclear detonation of an atomic bomb | Main article: 1950 Fairfield-Suisun Boeing B-29 crash A USAF B-29 bomber with a Mark 4 nuclear bomb (minus a fissile core) on board, flying to Guam, experienced malfunctions with two propellers and with landing gear retraction during take-off and crashed while attempting an emergency landing at Fairfield Suisun-AFB. In the resulting fire, the bomb's high-explosive material exploded, killing nineteen people from the crew and rescue personnel. Brigadier General Robert F. Travis, command pilot of the bomber, was among the dead. |
| November 10, 1950 | Rivière-du-Loup, Québec, Canada | Non-nuclear detonation of an atomic bomb | Main article: 1950 Rivière-du-Loup B-50 nuclear weapon loss incident Returning one of several U.S. Mark 4 nuclear bombs (minus a fissile core) secretly deployed in Canada, a USAF B-50 had engine trouble and jettisoned the weapon at 10,500 feet (3,200 m). The crew set the bomb to self-destruct at 2,500 ft (760 m) and dropped over the St. Lawrence River. The explosion shook area residents and scattered nearly 100 pounds (45 kg) of uranium (U-238) used in the weapon's tamper. |
| March 1, 1954 | Bikini Atoll, Republic of the Marshall Islands (then Trust Territory of the Pacific Islands) | Nuclear test accident | The Castle Bravo fallout pattern. During the Castle Bravo test of the first deployable hydrogen bomb, a miscalculation resulted in the explosion being over twice as large as predicted, with a total explosive force of 15 megatons of TNT (63 PJ). Of the total yield, 10 Mt (42 PJ) were from fission of the natural uranium tamper, but those fission reactions were quite dirty, producing a large amount of fallout. Combined with the much larger than expected yield and an unanticipated wind shift, radioactive fallout spread into unexpected areas. A Japanese fishing boat, the Daigo Fukuryu Maru/Lucky Dragon, came into contact with the fallout, which caused many of the crew to become ill, with one fatality. The fallout spread eastward onto the inhabited Rongelap and Rongerik Atolls. These islands were not evacuated before the explosion due to the unanticipated fallout zone and the financial cost involved, but many of the Marshall Islands natives have since suffered from radiation burns and radioactive dusting and also similar fates as the Japanese fishermen and have received little, if any, compensation from the federal government. The test resulted in an international uproar and reignited Japanese concerns about radiation, especially with regard to the possible contamination of fish. Personal accounts of the Rongelap people can be seen in the documentary Children of Armageddon. |
| November 29, 1955 | Idaho, US | Partial meltdown | Operator error led to a partial core meltdown in the experimental EBR-I breeder reactor, resulting in temporarily elevated radioactivity levels in the reactor building and necessitating significant repair. |
| March 10, 1956 | Over the Mediterranean Sea | Loss of two capsules of nuclear weapons material in carrying cases | Main article: 1956 B-47 disappearance A USAF B-47 Stratojet on a non-stop mission from MacDill Air Force Base, Florida, to an overseas base descended into a cloud formation at 14,000 feet over the Mediterranean in preparation for an in-air refueling and vanished while transporting two capsules of nuclear weapons material in carrying cases (and no complete weapons; a nuclear detonation was not possible). A French news agency reported that the plane had exploded in the air Northeast of Saïdia, in French Morocco in the same general location of its last known position. The plane was lost while flying through dense clouds, and no trace of the cores and other wreckage was ever located. |
| July 27, 1956 | RAF Lakenheath in Suffolk, UK | Nuclear weapons damaged | Main article: RAF Lakenheath nuclear weapons accidents A USAF B-47 crashed into a storage igloo, spreading burning fuel over three Mark 6 nuclear bombs at RAF Lakenheath. A bomb disposal expert stated it was a miracle exposed detonators on one bomb did not fire. The weapons were in a storage configuration and there were no fissile capsules inside the weapons or the igloo. |
| May 22, 1957 | Kirtland AFB in New Mexico, US | Non-nuclear detonation of a Mark 17 thermonuclear bomb | A B-36 ferrying a Mark 17 nuclear bomb from Biggs AFB to Kirtland AFB dropped a thermonuclear weapon on approach to Kirtland. The weapon struck the ground 4.5 miles south of the Kirtland control tower and 0.3 miles west of the Sandia Base reservation. The weapon was completely destroyed by the detonation of its high explosive material, creating a crater 12 feet (3.7 m) deep and 25 feet (7.62 m) in diameter. Radioactive contamination at the crater lip amounted to 0.5 milliroentgen. The aircraft contained a nuclear capsule, containing the fissile core for the weapon, but it was not installed in the weapon at the time of the accident, and was not involved in the explosion of the weapon. |
| July 28, 1957 | Atlantic Ocean | Two nuclear weapons jettisoned and not recovered | A USAF C-124 aircraft from Dover Air Force Base, Delaware was carrying three weapons and one nuclear capsule aboard the aircraft at the time. Nuclear components were not installed in the weapons. While flying over the Atlantic Ocean, the aircraft experienced a loss of power. For their own safety, the crew jettisoned two bombs which were never recovered. Neither of the weapons detonated. The C-124 landed later with the other weapon and the nuclear capsule. |
| September 11, 1957 | Rocky Flats Plant, Golden, Colorado, US | Fire, release of nuclear materials | Main article: Radioactive contamination from the Rocky Flats Plant A fire began in a theoretically fireproof area inside the plutonium processing building, in a glovebox used to handle radioactive materials, igniting the combustible rubber gloves and plexiglas windows of the box. The fire quickly spread to the plutonium as various safety features failed. The fire spread through the ventilation system as the containment ability of the facility became compromised, with plumes of radioactive smoke sent high into the outside air. The fire raged inside the building for 13 hours over the night of the 11th & 12th before firefighters could finally extinguish it. In the aftermath, Atomic Energy Commission officials, and the Dow Chemical officials who ran the facility, did not admit the extent of the catastrophe, or the radiation danger, to local officials or the media. Knowledge of the extent of the damage and contamination was kept from the public for years. After the fire, plutonium was detected near a school 12 miles (19 km) away and around Denver 17 miles (27 km) away. An independent group of scientists conducting off-site testing 13 years later found plutonium contamination in areas in nearby Rocky Flats to be 400 to 1,500 times higher than normal, higher than any ever recorded near any urban area, including Nagasaki. The Atomic Energy Commission then conducted its own off-site study, and that study confirmed plutonium contamination as far as 30 miles (48 km) from the plant. |
| September 29, 1957 | Kyshtym, Chelyabinsk Oblast, Russian Soviet Federative Socialist Republic, USSR (now Russian Federation) | Explosion, release of nuclear materials | Main article: Kyshtym disaster A cooling system failure at the Mayak nuclear processing plant resulted in a major explosion and release of radioactive materials. A large area was subjected to radioactive contamination and thousands of local inhabitants were evacuated. |
| October 8–12, 1957 | Sellafield, Cumbria, UK | Reactor core fire | Main article: Windscale fire Technicians mistakenly overheated Windscale Pile No. 1 during an annealing process to release Wigner energy from graphite portions of the reactor. Poorly placed temperature sensors indicated the reactor was cooling rather than heating. The excess heat led to the failure of a nuclear cartridge, which in turn allowed uranium and irradiated graphite to react with air. The resulting fire burned for days, damaging a significant portion of the reactor core. About 150 burning fuel cells could not be removed from the core, but operators succeeded in creating a firebreak by removing nearby fuel cells. An effort to cool the graphite core with water and the switching off of the air cooling system eventually quenched the fire. The reactor had released radioactive gases into the surrounding countryside, primarily in the form of iodine-131 (^{131}I). Milk distribution was banned in a 200-square-mile (520 km^{2}) area around the reactor for several weeks. A 1987 report by the National Radiological Protection Board predicted the accident would cause as many as 100 long-term cancer deaths, although the Medical Research Council Committee concluded that "it is in the highest degree unlikely that any harm has been done to the health of anybody, whether a worker in the Windscale plant or a member of the general public." The reactor that burned was one of two air-cooled, graphite-moderated natural uranium reactors at the site used for production of weapons-grade plutonium for military purposes. A 2007 study concluded that because the actual amount of radiation released in the fire could be double the previous estimates, and that the radioactive plume actually travelled further east, there were 100 to 240 cancer fatalities in the long term as a result of the fire. |
| October 11, 1957 | Homestead Air Force Base, Florida | Nuclear bomb burned after B-47 aircraft accident | B-47 aircraft crashed during take-off after a wheel exploded; one Mark 15 Mod 0 nuclear bomb burned in the resulting fire. The aircraft was carrying the unarmed weapon in a ferry configuration in the bomb bay, and the nuclear capsule in the crew compartment. Two "low-order" explosions occurred during the two hours that the plane and weapons burned. The nuclear capsule was recovered intact with minor damage. The "pit" of the bomb itself melted and re-solidified within the weapon case. |
| January 31, 1958 | Sidi Slimane Air Base, Morocco | Nuclear bomb damaged in crash | During a simulated takeoff, a wheel casting failure caused the tail of a USAF B-47 carrying a Mark 36 Mod 1 nuclear bomb to hit the runway, rupturing a fuel tank and sparking a fire which burned for some 7 hours. The weapon used in-flight insertion and the weapon was in its retracted, unarmed state. The high explosives in the weapon burned but did not detonate, but the weapon capsule melted and "settled into a molten slag of the burned aircraft and bomb." A report described the slag as former "a slab of slag material weighing approximately 8,000 pounds, approximately 6 to 8 feet wide and 12 to 15 feet in length with a thickness of 10 to 12 inches," and that a jackhammer was used to break it into smaller pieces, with the "hot" pieces carted out, but the rest buried nearby. Some contamination was detected immediately following the accident in the remains of the airplane and weapon, as well as part of the runway, and explosive ordnance disposal crew tracked contamination on their shoes and clothing back to their home base. After the accident, B-47 flights were temporarily suspended pending inspection of their wheels for defects. |
| February 5, 1958 | Savannah, Georgia, US | Unarmed nuclear bomb lost | Main article: 1958 Tybee Island mid-air collision A USAF B-47 bomber jettisoned a Mark 15 Mod 0 nuclear bomb (the nuclear capsule was not aboard the aircraft; the bomb contained a simulated 150-pound (68 kg) capsule made of lead) over the Atlantic Ocean after a midair collision with a USAF F-86 Sabre during a simulated combat mission from Homestead Air Force Base, Florida. The F-86's pilot ejected and parachuted to safety. The USAF claimed the B-47 tried landing at Hunter Air Force Base, Georgia three times before the bomb was jettisoned at 7,200 ft (2,200 m) near Tybee Island, Georgia. The B-47 pilot successfully landed in one attempt only after he first jettisoned the bomb. A 3-square-mile (7.8 km^{2}) area near Wassaw Sound was searched for nine weeks before the search was called off. |
| February 28, 1958 | Greenham Common US Base, Newbury, England | | A B-47E of the USAF 310th Bomb Wing developed problems shortly after takeoff and jettisoned its two 1,700 gallon external fuel tanks. They missed their designated safe impact area, and one hit a hangar while the other struck the ground 65 feet (20 m) behind a parked B-47E. The parked plane, which was fuelled, had a pilot on board, and was carrying a 1.1 megaton (4.6 PJ) B28 nuclear bomb, was engulfed by flames. The conflagration took sixteen hours and over a million gallons of water to extinguish, partly because of the magnesium alloys used in the aircraft. Although two men were killed and eight injured, the US and UK governments kept the accident secret: as late as 1985, the British government claimed that a taxiing aircraft had struck a parked one and that no fire was involved. |
| March 11, 1958 | Mars Bluff, South Carolina | Non-nuclear detonation of a nuclear bomb | Main article: 1958 Mars Bluff B-47 nuclear weapon loss incident A USAF B-47E bomber, number 53-1876A, was flying from Hunter Air Force Base in Savannah, Georgia, to England in a formation of four B-47s on a top-secret mission called Operation Snow Flurry to perform a mock bombing exercise. The flight navigator/bombardier was checking the locking harness on the massive (7,600 pounds (3,447 kg)) Mark 6 nuclear bomb when he accidentally pushed the emergency release lever. The bomb fell on the bomb-bay doors, smashing them open and going into a 15,000 feet (4,572 m) free fall. The high-explosive detonator went off after it hit the ground 6.5 miles east of Florence, South Carolina, in Mars Bluff, creating a 70 feet (21 m) wide crater, 30 feet (9 m) deep. A nearby house was destroyed and several people were injured. The weapon did not have an installed nuclear capsule at the time of the accident, and so a nuclear detonation was not possible. There was a nuclear capsule on board the plane, in another section of the aircraft. |
| June 16, 1958 | Oak Ridge, Tennessee, US | Accidental criticality | A supercritical portion of highly enriched uranyl nitrate was allowed to collect in the drum causing a prompt neutron criticality in the C-1 wing of building 9212 at the Y-12 complex. It is estimated that the reaction produced 1.3 × 10^{18} fissions. Eight employees were in close proximity to the drum during the accident, receiving neutron doses ranging from 30 to 477 rems. No fatalities were reported. |
| November 4, 1958 | Dyess Air Force Base, Texas, US | Non-nuclear detonation of a nuclear bomb | A USAF B-47 bomber developed a fire shortly after take-off and went down with a sealed-pit Mark 39 Mod 1 nuclear weapon on board from an altitude of 1,500 ft (460 m). The detonation of the high explosive material in the bomb left a crater 35 feet (11 m) in diameter and 6 feet (1.8 m) deep. Three crew members escaped, and one was killed. All weapons components were ultimately accounted for, after digging for them in the crater. |
| November 26, 1958 | Chennault Air Force Base, Louisiana, US | Non-nuclear detonation of a nuclear bomb | A USAF B-47 bomber with a sealed-pit nuclear weapon on board developed a fire while on the ground. The aircraft wreckage and the site of the accident were contaminated after a limited explosion of non-nuclear material. |
| December 30, 1958 | Los Alamos, New Mexico, US | Accidental criticality | During chemical purification, a critical mass of a plutonium solution was accidentally assembled at Los Alamos National Laboratory. A chemical operator named Cecil E. Kelley died of acute radiation sickness. The March 1961 Journal of Occupational and Environmental Medicine printed a special supplement medically analyzing this accident. Hand manipulation of critical assemblies was abandoned as a matter of policy in U.S. federal facilities after this accident. |
| January 18, 1959 | Osan Air Base, South Korea | Nuclear weapon on fire | A parked USAF F-100C Super Sabre, loaded with a nuclear weapon, developed a fire after its external fuel tanks were dropped and exploded during a practice alert. The resulting fire was put out in seven minutes and there was no nuclear explosion. When originally disclosed in 1980, the location was identified as a base in the Pacific region. In 2016, the newspaper Asahi Shimbun reported that the location of the accident was Osan Air Base. |
| July 6, 1959 | Barksdale AFB, Louisiana, US | Limited contamination | A USAF C-124 transporting three Mark 39 Mod 2 sealed-pit nuclear weapons crashed and burned down during take-off. The high explosives did not detonate, but one weapon was completely destroyed by the fire, and the other two suffered heat damage and tritium leakage. The wreckage area experienced limited contamination. |
| September 25, 1959 | Eastern Pacific Ocean | Lost nuclear weapon casing | A U.S. Navy P5M antisubmarine aircraft patrolling out of NAS Whidbey Island with an unarmed Mark 90 nuclear depth charge casing on board crash-landed in the Pacific Ocean, about 100 miles (160 km) west of the Washington-Oregon border. The casing was not recovered. |
| October 15, 1959 | Hardinsburg, Kentucky, US | Nuclear weapon partially damaged | After both planes took off from Columbus Air Force Base in Mississippi, a USAF B-52F-100-BO (No. 57-036), with two sealed-pit nuclear weapons collided at 32,000 feet (9,754 m) with a KC-135 refueling aircraft (No. 57-1513), during a refueling procedure near Hardinsburg, Kentucky. Both planes crashed killing eight crew members. One unarmed nuclear weapon was partially damaged, but no contamination resulted. |
| November 20, 1959 | Oak Ridge, Tennessee, US | Explosion | A chemical explosion occurred during decontamination of processing machinery in the radiochemical processing plant at Oak Ridge National Laboratory in Tennessee . (Report ORNL-2989, Oak Ridge National Laboratory). The accident resulted in the release of about 15 grams (0.53 oz) of ^{239}Pu. |

== 1960s ==
| Date | Location | Type | Description |
|---|---|---|---|
| June 7, 1960 | New Egypt, New Jersey, US | Nuclear warhead damaged by fire | A helium tank exploded and ruptured the fuel tanks of a USAF BOMARC-A surface-to-air missile at McGuire Air Force Base, New Jersey. The fire destroyed the missile, and contaminated the area directly below and adjacent to the missile. |
| October 13, 1960 | Barents Sea, Arctic Ocean | Release of nuclear materials | A leak developed in the steam generators and in a pipe leading to the compensator reception on the ill-fated K-8 while the Soviet Northern Fleet November-class submarine was on exercise. While the crew rigged an improvised cooling system, radioactive gases leaked into the vessel and three of the crew suffered visible radiation injuries according to radiological experts in Moscow. Some crew members had been exposed to doses of up to 1.8–2 Sv (180–200 rem). |
| January 3, 1961 | National Reactor Testing Station, Idaho, US | Accidental criticality, steam explosion, 3 fatalities, release of fission products | SL-1 reactor being removed from the National Reactor Testing Station. Further information: SL-1 § Accident_and_response During a maintenance shutdown, the SL-1 experimental nuclear reactor underwent a prompt critical reaction causing core materials to explosively vaporize. Water hammer estimated at 10,000 pounds per square inch (69,000 kPa) struck the top of the reactor vessel propelling the entire reactor vessel upwards over 9 feet (2.7 m) in the air. One operator who had been standing on top of the vessel was killed when a shield plug impaled him and lodged in the ceiling. Two other military personnel were also killed from the trauma of the explosion, one of which had removed the central control rod too far. The plant had to be dismantled and the contamination was buried permanently nearby. Most of the release of radioactive materials was concentrated within the reactor building. |
| January 24, 1961 | Goldsboro, North Carolina, US | Physical destruction of a nuclear bomb, loss of nuclear materials | Main article: 1961 Goldsboro B-52 crash A USAF B-52 bomber caught fire and exploded in midair due to a major leak in a wing fuel cell 12 miles (19 km) north of Seymour Johnson Air Force Base, North Carolina. Five crewmen parachuted to safety, but three others died—two in the aircraft and one on landing. The incident released the bomber's two Mark 39 nuclear bombs. Three of the four arming devices on one of the bombs activated, causing it to carry out many of the steps needed to arm itself, such as the charging of the firing capacitors and, critically, the deployment of a 100-foot (30 m) diameter retardation parachute. The parachute allowed the bomb to hit the ground with little damage. The fourth arming device—the pilot's safe/arm switch—was not activated, preventing detonation. The second bomb plunged into a muddy field at around 700 mph (300 m/s) and disintegrated. Its tail was discovered about 20 feet (6 m) down and much of the bomb recovered, including the tritium bottle and the plutonium. However, excavation was abandoned due to uncontrollable ground water flooding. Most of the thermonuclear stage, containing uranium, was left on site. It is estimated to lie around 55 feet (17 m) below ground. The Air Force purchased the land and fenced it off to prevent its disturbance, and it is tested regularly for contamination, although none has so far been found. |
| March 14, 1961 | Yuba City, California, US | Physical destruction of a nuclear bomb, loss of nuclear materials | Main article: 1961 Yuba City B-52 crash USAF B-52 bomber departed Mather Air Force Base, California and experienced a decompression event that required it to fly below 10,000 feet. Resulting increased fuel consumption led to fuel exhaustion; the aircraft crashed near Yuba City, California with two nuclear bombs, which did not trigger a nuclear explosion. |
| July 4, 1961 | Coast of Norway | Near meltdown | The Soviet Hotel-class submarine K-19 suffered a failure in its cooling system. Reactor core temperatures reached 800 °C (1,500 °F), nearly enough to melt the fuel rods, although the crew was able to regain temperature control by using emergency procedures. The incident contaminated parts of the ship, some of the onboard ballistic missiles and the crew, resulting in several fatalities. The film K-19: The Widowmaker, starring Harrison Ford and Liam Neeson, offers a controversially fictionalized story of these events. |
| May 1, 1962 | Sahara desert, French Algeria (now Algeria) | Accidental venting of underground nuclear test | The second French underground nuclear test, codenamed Béryl, took place in a shaft under Mount Taourirt, near In Ecker, 150 km (93 mi) north of Tamanrasset, Algerian Sahara. Due to improper sealing of the shaft, a spectacular flame burst through the concrete cap and radioactive gases and dust were vented into the atmosphere. The plume climbed up to 2,600 m (8,500 ft) high and radiation was detected hundreds of kilometers away. About a hundred soldiers and officials, including two ministers, were irradiated. The number of contaminated Algerians is unknown. |
| May 22, 1962 | Chico, California, US | Explosion of Titan I ICBM | A Titan I ICBM exploded in its silo in Chico, California. During a contractor checkout, a leak and subsequent explosion occurred at launcher 1 at complex 4C at Chico, destroying a Titan I and causing heavy damage to the silo. The Air Force concluded that the two separate explosions occurred because of a blocked vent and blocked valve. All contractors and crew of the silo escaped unharmed. |
| June 20, 1962 | Johnson Island | Self-destruction of nuclear-armed Thor missile | Part of the Starfish test series by the US military, a Thor missile was launched but had its flight aborted one minute after its takeoff. No nuclear explosion took place. However, heavily contaminated missile components fell back down upon the island where service personnel worked and lived. |
| July 25, 1962 | Johnson Island | Explosion of nuclear-armed Thor missile | A Thor missile exploded on its launchpad, scattering highly contaminated debris all over the island. Service personnel were heavily exposed to radiation both during the explosion and in subsequent emergency clean-up efforts. Veterans who were exposed to the high radiological hazards all suffered lethal long-term effects of radiation-based cancers. |
| April 10, 1963 | Atlantic Ocean | Loss of nuclear reactor | The United States Navy submarine USS Thresher sank about 190 nmi (220 mi; 350 km) east of Cape Cod, Massachusetts due to improper welds allowing in seawater which forced a shutdown of the reactor. Poor design of its emergency blow system prevented the ship from surfacing and the disabled ship ultimately descended to crush depth and imploded, killing all 129 on board. Wreckage remains on the sea floor at 8,400 feet (2,600 m) below the surface |
| January 13, 1964 | Salisbury, Pennsylvania and Frostburg, Maryland, US | Accidental loss and recovery of thermonuclear bombs | Main article: 1964 Savage Mountain B-52 crash A USAF B-52 on airborne alert duty encountered a severe winter storm and extreme turbulence, ultimately disintegrating in midair over South Central Pennsylvania. Only the two pilots survived. One crew member failed to bail out and the rest succumbed to injuries or exposure to the harsh winter weather. A search for the missing weapons was initiated, and recovery was effected from portions of the wreckage at a farm northwest of Frostburg, MD. |
| December 5, 1964 | Ellsworth AFB, South Dakota | Minuteman ICBM missile warhead separation | The warhead separated in the launch tube due to an electrical short circuit and fell to the bottom of the tube, at launch facility Lima-02 near Vale, South Dakota. The missile site was part of the former 44th Missile Wing at Ellsworth AFB, South Dakota. |
| December 8, 1964 | Bunker Hill Air Force Base, Indiana, US | Fire, radioactive contamination | A USAF B-58 aircraft carrying a B53 nuclear bomb internally, and four B43 nuclear bombs externally, caught fire while taxiing after its landing gear collapsed. The B53 burned, causing contamination of the crash area. Two of the B43s caused some plutonium and uranium contamination. One of the B43 bombs was crushed between the plane's collapsed wing and a snowbank while the plane burned, causing a "unique and previously unevaluated situation" in which a nuclear weapon was made to experience "extreme cold, crushing impact, and intense heat simultaneously." |
| January 1965 | Livermore, California, US | Release of nuclear materials | An accident at Lawrence Livermore National Laboratory released 300 kCi (11 PBq) of tritium gas. Subsequent study found this release was not likely to produce adverse health effects in the surrounding communities. |
| October 11, 1965 | Rocky Flats Plant, Golden, Colorado, US | Fire, exposure of workers | Further information: Radioactive contamination from the Rocky Flats Plant A fire at Rocky Flats exposed a crew of 25 to up to 17 times the legal limit for radiation. |
| December 5, 1965 | Philippine Sea | Loss of a nuclear bomb | Main article: 1965 Philippine Sea A-4 incident A U.S. Navy A-4E Skyhawk aircraft with one B43 nuclear bomb on board fell off the aircraft carrier USS Ticonderoga into 16,200 feet (4,900 m) of water while the ship was underway from Vietnam to Yokosuka, Japan. The plane, pilot and weapon were never recovered. There is dispute over exactly where the incident took place—the U.S. Defense Department originally stated it took place 500 miles (800 km) off the coast of Japan; The accident was said to occur 68 miles (59 nmi; 109 km) from Kikai Island, Kagoshima Prefecture, Japan. U.S. Navy documents later show it happened about 80 miles (130 km) from the Ryukyu Islands and 200 miles (320 km) from Okinawa. |
| January 17, 1966 | Palomares, Almería, Spain | Accidental destruction, loss and recovery of nuclear bombs | Main article: 1966 Palomares B-52 crash A USAF B-52 carrying four hydrogen bombs collided with a USAF KC-135 jet tanker during over-ocean in-flight refueling. Four of the B-52's seven crew members parachuted to safety while the remaining three were killed along with all four of the KC-135's crew. The conventional explosives in two of the bombs detonated upon impact with the ground, dispersing plutonium over nearby farms. A third bomb landed intact near Palomares, Almería (Spain) while the fourth fell 12 miles (19 km) off the coast into the Mediterranean sea. The U.S. Navy conducted a three-month search involving 12,000 men and successfully recovered the fourth bomb. The U.S. Navy employed the use of the deep-diving research submarine DSV Alvin to aid in the recovery efforts. During the ensuing cleanup, 1,500 tonnes (1,700 short tons) of radioactive soil and tomato plants were shipped to a nuclear dump in Aiken, South Carolina. The U.S. settled claims by 522 Palomares residents for $600,000. The town also received a $200,000 desalinization plant. The motion picture Men of Honor (2000), starring Cuba Gooding, Jr., as USN Diver, Master Chief Petty Officer Carl Brashear, and Robert De Niro as USN Diver, Chief Petty Officer Billy Sunday, contained an account of the fourth bomb's recovery. |
| January 21, 1968 | Thule Air Base, Greenland | Loss and partial recovery of nuclear bombs | Main article: 1968 Thule Air Base B-52 crash A fire broke out in the navigator's compartment of a USAF B-52 near Thule Air Base, Greenland. The bomber crashed 7 miles (11 km) from the airbase, rupturing the bomber's bomb bay and causing the conventional explosives in the four B28FI thermonuclear bombs to detonate, fragmenting and spreading the radioactive primary and secondary components across a large area. The burning bomber and its fuel load melted through the ice, dropping wreckage to the seafloor underneath. The recovery and decontamination effort was complicated by Greenland's harsh weather. Contaminated ice and debris were returned and buried in the United States. Recovered bomb fragments were recycled by Pantex, in Amarillo, Texas. The incident caused outrage and protests in Denmark, as Greenland is a Danish possession, and Denmark forbade nuclear weapons on its territory. |
| March 8, 1968 | 1,560 nautical miles (2,890 km) northwest of Oahu in the Pacific Ocean | ? | The Soviet nuclear submarine K-129 sank with a crew of 98 due to an explosion of unknown cause. The International Atomic Energy Agency stated that two nuclear warheads from K-129 were located in the Pacific 1,230 miles from Kamchatka at coordinates 40°6'N and 179°57'E at a depth of 6,000 metres (20,000 ft), and lists them as recovered. |
| Spring 1968 | Atlantic Ocean | ? | An official US Department of Defense summary of accidents in 1981 has one listing that reads only as: "Spring 1968 / At Sea, Atlantic. Details remain classified." It has been suggested that this was a reference to the sinking of the USS Scorpion, and that its classification status was because at the time, the US Navy did not acknowledge that it contained nuclear torpedoes. Another official, internal report on US nuclear accidents includes the Scorpion and the Thule accident (see below) as the only 1968 accidents, and describes it as taking placing "in the late spring of 1968... in the mid-atlantic." |
| May 22, 1968 | 740 km (400 nmi) southwest of the Azores | Loss of nuclear reactor and two W34 nuclear warheads | Mark 45 nuclear torpedo, similar to the two that were lost The U.S. submarine USS Scorpion sank while en route from Rota, Spain, to Norfolk, Virginia, United States. All 99 officers and men on board were killed, and while the cause of the sinking remains unknown, Scorpion's originally planned full overhaul was reduced in scope, and long-overdue SUBSAFE work, such as a new central valve control system, was not performed. The wreckage of the submarine, its S5W nuclear reactor, and its two Mark 45 torpedoes with W34 nuclear warheads, remain on the sea floor in more than 3,000 m (9,800 ft) of water. |
| May 24, 1968 | Barents Sea, Arctic Ocean | Loss of cooling, radioactive contamination, nuclear fuel damaged | During sea trials, the Soviet nuclear submarine K-27 (Project 645) suffered severe problems with its reactor cooling systems. After spending some time at reduced power, reactor output inexplicably dropped and sensors detected an increase of gamma radiation in the reactor compartment to 150 rad/h. The safety buffer tank released radioactive gases further contaminating the submarine. The crew shut the reactor down and subsequent investigation found that approximately 20% of the fuel assemblies were damaged. The entire submarine was scuttled in the Kara Sea in 1981. |
| August 27, 1968 | Severodvinsk, Russia (then USSR) | Reactor power excursion, contamination | While in the naval yards at Severodvinsk for repairs, the Soviet Yankee-class nuclear submarine K-140 suffered an uncontrolled increase of the reactor's power output. One of the reactors activated automatically when workers raised control rods to a higher position and power increased to 18 times normal, while pressure and temperature levels in the reactor increased to four times normal. The accident also increased radiation levels aboard the vessel. The problem was traced to the incorrect installation of control rod electrical cables. |
| May 11, 1969 | Rocky Flats Plant, Golden, Colorado, US | Plutonium fire, contamination | Further information: Radioactive contamination from the Rocky Flats Plant § 1969 fire An accident in which 5 kilograms of plutonium burnt inside a glovebox at Rocky Flats. Cleanup took two years and was the costliest industrial accident ever to occur in the United States at that time. |

== 1970s ==
| Date | Location | Type | Description |
|---|---|---|---|
| April 12, 1970 | Bay of Biscay | Loss of a nuclear submarine | The Soviet November-class attack submarine K-8 sank during salvage with 52 sailors on board after suffering fires in two compartments simultaneously. Both reactors were shut down. The crew attempted to hook a tow line to a Bulgarian merchant vessel, but ultimately failed. |
| December 18, 1970 | Nevada Test Site | Accidental venting of nuclear explosion | Baneberry's radioactive plume rises from a shock fissure. Contaminants were carried in three different directions by the wind. The Partial Nuclear Test Ban Treaty of 1963 was meant to prevent the nuclear fallout freely associated with the earlier above ground tests. Some venting might still happen on site, but the 1970 "Baneberry" test blast – part of Operation Emery – resulted in extensive off-site fallout. The 10-kiloton "Baneberry" test took place under Area 8 on Yucca Flat. The weapon detonated as planned at the bottom of a sealed vertical shaft 900 ft (270 m) below the Earth's surface, but the device's energy cracked the soil in unexpected ways, causing a fissure near ground zero and releasing a plume of hot gases and radioactive dust that continued for many hours, raining fallout on workers within NTS. Six percent of the explosion's radioactive products were vented, releasing 6.7 MCi of radioactive material, including 80 kCi of Iodine-131 and a high ratio of noble gases. The hot cloud's lighter particles were carried to three altitudes by three diverging jet stream layers and conveyed by winter storms and the jet stream to be deposited heavily as radionuclide-laden snow in Lassen and Sierra counties in northeast California, and to lesser degrees in northern Nevada, southern Idaho and some eastern sections of Oregon and Washington states. The three diverging jet stream layers conducted radionuclides across the U.S. to Canada, the Gulf of Mexico and the Atlantic Ocean. Some 86 workers at the site were exposed to radioactivity, but according to the Department of Energy, none received a dose exceeding site guidelines and, similarly, radiation drifting offsite was not considered to pose a hazard by the DOE. In March 2009, TIME magazine identified the Baneberry Test as one of the world's worst nuclear disasters. |
| December 12, 1971 | New London, Connecticut, US | Spill of irradiated water | During the transfer of radioactive coolant water from the submarine USS Dace to the submarine tender USS Fulton 500 US gallons (1,900 L; 420 imp gal) were spilled into the Thames River (US). |
| December 1972 | Pawling, New York, US | Contamination | A major fire and two explosions contaminated the plant and grounds of a plutonium fabrication facility resulting in a permanent shutdown. |
| April 21, 1973 | Pacific Ocean, 370 miles from Puget Sound | Primary coolant leak | The primary coolant leaked on board the submarine USS Guardfish while underway |
| 1975 | Location unknown | Contamination | Radioactive resin contaminated the American Sturgeon-class submarine USS Guardfish after the wind unexpectedly blew the powder back towards the ship. The resin is used to remove dissolved radioactive minerals and particles from the primary coolant loops of submarines. This type of accident was fairly common; however, U.S. Navy nuclear vessels no longer discharge resin at sea. |
| October 1975 | Apra Harbor, Guam | Spill of irradiated water | While disabled, the submarine tender USS Proteus discharged radioactive coolant water. A Geiger counter at two of the harbor's public beaches showed 100 millirems/hour, fifty times the allowable dose. |
| August 1976 | Benton County, Washington, United States | Explosion, contamination of worker | An explosion at the Hanford site Plutonium Finishing Plant blew out a quarter-inch-thick lead glass window. Harold McCluskey, a worker, was showered with nitric acid and radioactive glass. He inhaled the largest dose of ^{241}Am ever recorded, about 500 times the U.S. government occupational standards. The worker was placed in isolation for five months and given an experimental drug to flush the isotope from his body. By 1977, his body's radiation count had fallen by about 80 percent. He died of natural causes in 1987 at age 75. |
| 1977 | Coast of Kamchatka | Loss and recovery of a nuclear warhead | The Soviet submarine K-171 accidentally released a nuclear warhead. The warhead was recovered after a search involving dozens of ships and aircraft. |
| January 24, 1978 | Northwest Territories, Canada | Spill of nuclear fuel | Kosmos 954, a Soviet Radar Ocean Reconnaissance Satellite with an onboard nuclear reactor, failed to separate from its booster and broke up on reentry over Western and Northern Canada. The fuel was spread over a wide area and some radioactive pieces were recovered. The Soviet Union eventually paid the Canadian government 3 million CAD ($13 million today) for expenses relating to the crash. |
| May 22, 1978 | Near Puget Sound, Washington, United States | Spill of irradiated water | A valve was mistakenly opened aboard the submarine USS Puffer releasing up to 500 US gallons (1,900 L; 420 imp gal) of radioactive water. |

== 1980s ==
| Date | Location | Type | Description |
|---|---|---|---|
| September 18, 1980 | Little Rock AFB, Arkansas, US | Nuclear missile fuel explosion | Main article: 1980 Damascus Titan missile explosion At about 6:30 p.m., an airman conducting maintenance on a USAF Titan-II missile at Little Rock Air Force Base's Launch Complex 374–7 in Southside (Van Buren County), just north of Damascus, Arkansas, dropped a nine-pound (4 kg) socket from a socket wrench, which fell about 80 feet (24 m) before hitting and piercing the skin on the rocket's first-stage fuel tank, causing it to leak. The area was evacuated. Overnight, at about 3:00 a.m., the hypergolic fuel exploded. The W53 warhead landed about 100 feet (30 m) from the launch complex's entry gate; its safety features operated correctly and prevented any explosion, chemical or nuclear. An Air Force airman, David Livingston, was killed and the launch complex was destroyed. |
| February 1982 to December 1989 | Kola Peninsula, Russia (former USSR) | Release of nuclear materials | The Andreev Bay nuclear accident was associated with leaks in a massive cooling and storage pool. The leaks caused about 700,000 tonnes of highly radioactive water to leak into the Barents Sea during that time period. During the extensive period of attempted repairs and subsequent dismantling of the pool, other incidents occurred on site, including accidental accumulations of critical masses of material releasing radiation and an "industrial accident" that caused two cleanup workers to plunge directly into the radioactive pool. |
| August 8, 1982 | Barents Sea | Release of nuclear materials | While on duty in the Barents Sea, there was a release of liquid metal coolant from the reactor of the Soviet Project 705 Alfa-class submarine K-123. The accident was caused by a leak in the steam generator. Approximately two tons of metal alloy leaked into the reactor compartment, irreparably damaging the reactor so it had to be replaced. It took nine years to repair the submarine. |
| January 3, 1983 | South Atlantic | Contamination | The Soviet nuclear-powered spy satellite Kosmos 1402 burned up over the South Atlantic. |
| August 10, 1985 | Chazhma Bay, Vladivostok | Release of nuclear materials | About 35 miles (56 km) from Vladivostok in Chazhma Bay, the Soviet Echo-class submarine K-431 suffered a reactor explosion, producing fatally high levels of radiation. Ten men were killed, but the deadly cloud of radioactivity did not reach Vladivostok. |
| 1986 | Hanford Site, Washington, US | Release of nuclear materials | The U.S. government declassified 19,000 pages of documents indicating that between 1946 and 1986, the Hanford Site near Richland, Washington, released thousands of US gallons of radioactive liquids. Many of the people living in the affected area received low doses of radiation from ^{131}I. |
| October 3, 1986 | North Atlantic | Loss of two nuclear reactors and either 32 or 48 warheads (Note: The missiles involved in the accident must have been the R-27U version as the original version was retired by 1983. Sources given conflicting numbers on the number of warheads carried by the R-27U, either two or three.) | 480 miles (770 km) east of Bermuda, the Soviet Yankee I-class submarine K-219 experienced an explosion in one of its missile tubes and at least three crew members were killed. Sixteen nuclear missiles and two reactors were on board. Soviet leader Mikhail Gorbachev privately communicated news of the disaster to U.S. President Ronald Reagan before publicly acknowledging the incident on October 4. Two days later, on October 6, the submarine sank in the Atlantic Ocean while under tow in 18,000 feet (5,500 m) of water. |
| October 1988 | Rocky Flats Plant, Golden, Colorado, US | Contamination, exposure of workers | At the nuclear pit fabrication facility at Rocky Flats in Colorado, two employees and a United States Department of Energy inspector inhaled radioactive particles, causing closure of the plant. Several safety violations were cited, including uncalibrated monitors, inadequate fire equipment, and groundwater contaminated with radioactivity. |

== 1990s ==
| Date | Location | Type | Description |
|---|---|---|---|
| 1997 | Georgia | Radiological accident | Soldiers suffered radiation poisoning and burns. They were eventually traced back to training sources abandoned, forgotten, and unlabeled after the dissolution of the Soviet Union. One was a ^{137}Cs pellet in a pocket of a shared jacket which put out about 130,000 times the level of background radiation at a one-metre (3.3 ft) distance. |

== 2000s ==
| Date | Location | Type | Description |
|---|---|---|---|
| February 2003 | Y-12 facility, Oak Ridge, Tennessee, US | Processing vessel explosion | Y-12 National Security Complex During the final testing of a new saltless uranium processing method, there was a small explosion followed by a fire. The explosion occurred in an unvented vessel containing unreacted calcium, water and depleted uranium. An exothermic reaction in the vessel generated enough steam to burst the container. This small explosion breached its glovebox, allowing air to enter and ignite some loose uranium powder. Three employees were contaminated. BWXT Y-12 (now B&W Y-12), a partnership of Babcock & Wilcox and Bechtel, was fined $82,500 for the accident. |

== 2010s ==
| Date | Location | Type | Description |
|---|---|---|---|
| 8 August 2019 | State Central Navy Testing Range near Nyonoksa | Explosive destruction of a nuclear power source | Main article: Nyonoksa radiation accident According to the version presented by Russian officials, it was a result of a failed test of an "isotope power source for a liquid-fuelled rocket engine". Nonproliferation expert Jeffrey Lewis and Federation of American Scientists fellow Ankit Panda suspect the incident resulted from a test of the Burevestnik cruise missile. However, other arms control experts disputed the assertions; Ian Williams of the Center for Strategic and International Studies and James Acton of the Carnegie Endowment for International Peace expressed skepticism over Moscow's financial and technical capabilities to field the weapon, while Michael Kofman of the Wilson Center concluded that the explosion was probably not related to Burevestnik but instead to the testing of another military platform. According to CNBC, the Russians were trying to recover a missile from the seabed which was lost during a previously failed test. |

== See also ==
- 1983 Soviet nuclear false alarm incident
- Broken Arrow (nuclear)
- International Nuclear Event Scale
- List of accidents and incidents involving military aircraft
- Lists of disasters
- Nuclear weapon
- Radiation
- United States military nuclear incident terminology
- Vulnerability of nuclear plants to attack

== Bibliography ==
- Annotated bibliography from the Alsos Digital Library for Nuclear related Issues and Incidents
- (in French) Jean-Hugues Oppel, Réveillez le président !, Éditions Payot et rivages, 2007 (ISBN 978-2-7436-1630-4). The book is a fiction about the nuclear weapons of France; the book also contains about ten chapters on true historical incidents involving nuclear weapons and strategy (during the second half of the twentieth century).
- Nilsen, Thomas, Igor Kudrik and Alexandr Nikitin. Russian Northern Fleet: Sources of Radioactive Contamination. Bellona Report 2:1996, 28. August 1996.
- Eric Schlosser (2013). Command and Control: Nuclear Weapons, the Damascus Accident, and the Illusion of Safety. Penguin Press. ISBN 978-1594202278.
- The Limits of Safety (1993, Princeton University Press) by Scott Sagan
