= K171 =

K171 or K-171 may refer to:

- Soviet submarine K-171
- K-171 (Kansas highway), state highway in Kansas
- K-171 (1958–2010 Kansas highway), former state highway in Kansas
