= Wassaw Sound =

Bay in Georgia, United States

Coordinates: 31°56′01″N 80°56′59″W

Wassaw Sound is a bay of the Atlantic Ocean on the coast of Georgia, United States near Savannah at the mouth of the Wilmington River.

== American Civil War naval battle ==
It was the location of an American Civil War naval battle between the CSS Atlanta and Union ships in 1863.

== Tybee Bomb ==
It is the location of a hydrogen bomb lost by a B-47 Stratojet bomber in 1958. This lost hydrogen bomb is also known as the Tybee Bomb. On the night of February 5, 1958, a B-47 Stratojet bomber carrying a hydrogen bomb on a night training flight off the Georgia coast collided with an F-86 Saberjet fighter at 36,000 feet. The collision destroyed the fighter and severely damaged a wing of the bomber, leaving one of its engines partially dislodged. The bomber's pilot, Maj. Howard Richardson, was instructed to jettison the H-bomb before attempting a landing. Richardson dropped the bomb into the shallow waters of Wassaw Sound, near the mouth of the Savannah River, a few miles from the city of Tybee Island, where he believed the bomb would be swiftly recovered.

The Pentagon recorded the incident in a top secret memo to the chairman of the United States Atomic Energy Commission (AEC). The memo has been partially declassified: "A B-47 aircraft with a nuclear weapon aboard was damaged in a collision with an F-86 aircraft near Sylvania, Georgia, on February 5, 1958. The B-47 aircraft attempted three times unsuccessfully to land with the weapon. The weapon was then jettisoned visually over water off the mouth of the Savannah River. No detonation was observed."

Soon search and rescue teams were sent to the site. Wassaw Sound was cordoned off by United States Air Force troops. For six weeks, the Air Force looked for the bomb without success. Underwater divers scoured the depths, troops tromped through nearby salt marshes, and a blimp hovered over the area attempting to spot a hole or crater in the beach or swamp. Then just a month later, the search was abruptly halted. The Air Force sent its forces to Florence, South Carolina, where another H-bomb had been accidentally dropped by a B-47. The bomb's 200 pounds of TNT exploded on impact, sending radioactive debris across the landscape. The explosion caused extensive property damage and several injuries on the ground. The weapon itself did not detonate.

The search teams never returned to Tybee Island, and the missing H-bomb was declared lost.

The bomb was again searched for in 2001 and not found. A new group in 2004 headed by Derek Duke claimed to have found an underwater object which it thinks is the bomb, but the US Army Corps of Engineers discounted the claim, saying the radioactive traces detected by the group were "naturally occurring".

The fake news website World News Daily Report ran a story in February 2015 stating the bomb was found by vacationing Canadian divers and that the bomb had since been removed from the sound. The fake story spread widely via social media.

== 1996 Summer Olympics ==
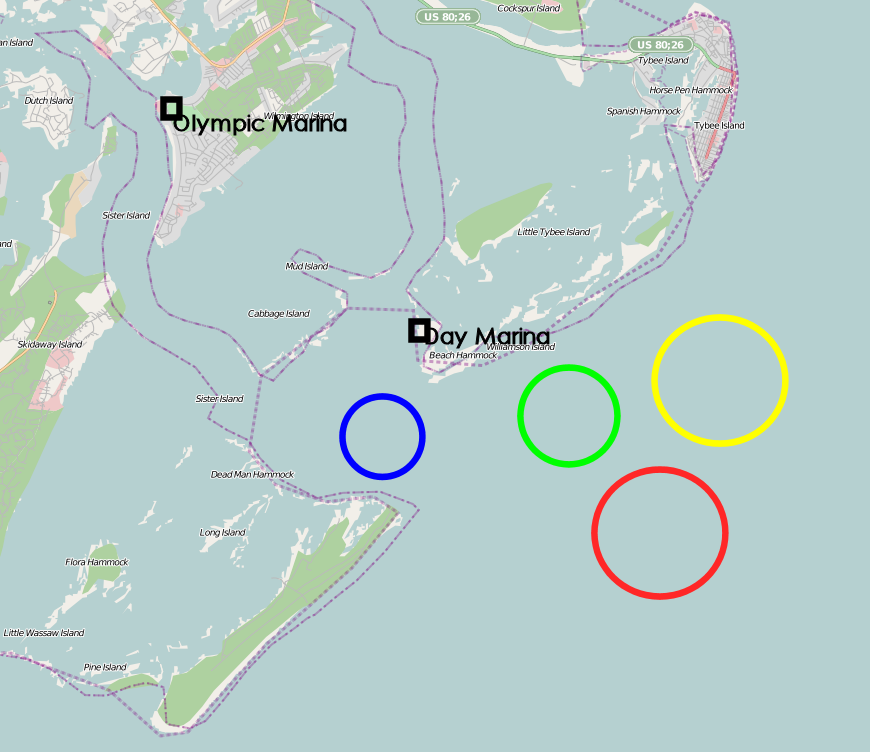
Black = Marinas Yellow = Finn & Star area and 470 course area Red = Tornado & Soling course area Green = Europe & Laser course area Blue = Windsurf and Soling Matchrace course area

The sound served as the sailing venue for the 1996 Summer Olympics.

== See also ==
- List of military nuclear accidents
