= 1950 Rivière-du-Loup B-50 nuclear weapon loss incident =

Accidental bomb release from an aircraft

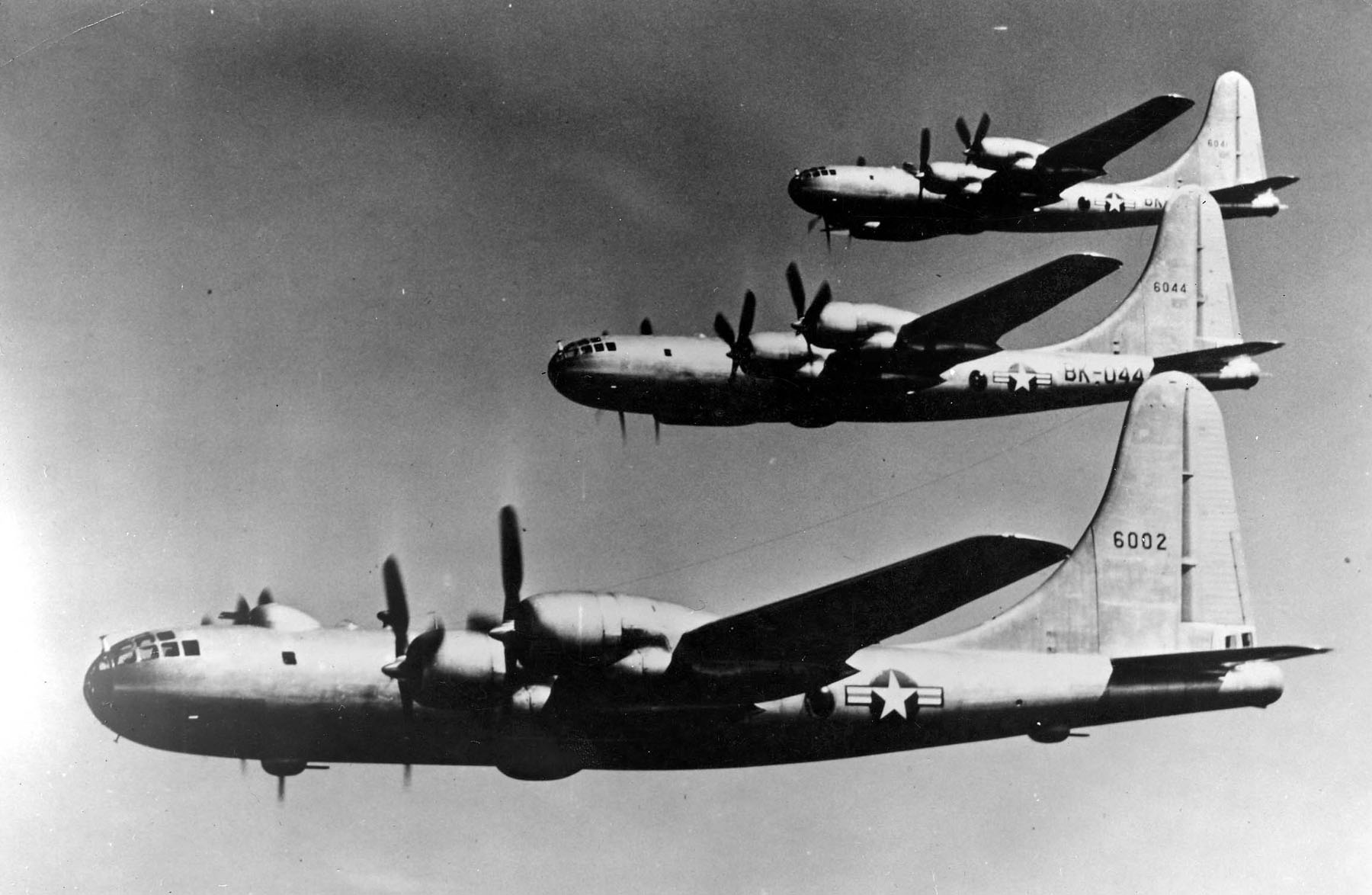
- Three B-50A bombers in formation; similar to the B-50 that dropped the bomb at Rivière-du-Loup

Incident
- Date: November 10, 1950
- Site: Rivière-du-Loup, approx 300 mi (480 km; 260 nmi) northeast of Montreal, Quebec, Canada; 47°56′6″N 69°25′15″W

Aircraft
- Aircraft type: Boeing B-50 Superfortress
- Operator: United States Air Force
- Flight origin: CFB Goose Bay
- Destination: Davis–Monthan Air Force Base (diverted to Loring AFB)
- Passengers: 0
- Crew: 0
- Fatalities: 0
- Injuries: 0
- Missing: 0
- Survivors: 0

The 1950 Rivière-du-Loup B-50 nuclear weapon loss incident was the loss of a nuclear weapon near Rivière-du-Loup, Quebec, Canada, in November 1950. The bomb was released due to engine troubles, and then was destroyed in a non-nuclear detonation before it hit the ground.

== Background ==
Returning one of several US Mark 4 nuclear bombs secretly deployed at Goose Bay AFB in Labrador, a USAF Boeing B-50 Superfortress had engine trouble and jettisoned the weapon at 10,500 feet (3,200 m). The crew released it over the St. Lawrence River where it conventionally detonated, presumably on impact. The non-nuclear explosion shook area residents and scattered nearly 100 pounds (45 kg) of radioactive uranium (U-238) used in the weapon's tamper. The plutonium core ("pit"), which is the key component for a nuclear reaction and detonation, was not installed in the bomb at the time. The absence of the core probably was because of its high cost and relative scarcity at the time. Standard US Air Force protocol prohibited any aircraft carrying a nuclear device to land with the device if the aircraft was experiencing engine problems — it had to be jettisoned. Per standard protocol, the plutonium trigger was always removed prior to flight and shipped separately to prevent accidental nuclear activation. At the time of the incident, the aircraft was returning from Goose Bay AFB to Davis–Monthan Air Force Base. The troubled aircraft successfully diverted to Loring Air Force Base in Maine.

The incident was immediately covered up at the time, and explained away as 500-pound (230 kg) military practice bombs being detonated. It was not until the 1980s that the Air Force confirmed it had been a nuclear incident.

== See also ==
- List of military nuclear accidents
