= 1958 Mars Bluff B-47 nuclear weapon loss incident =

Accidental release of a nuclear weapon in South Carolina, United States

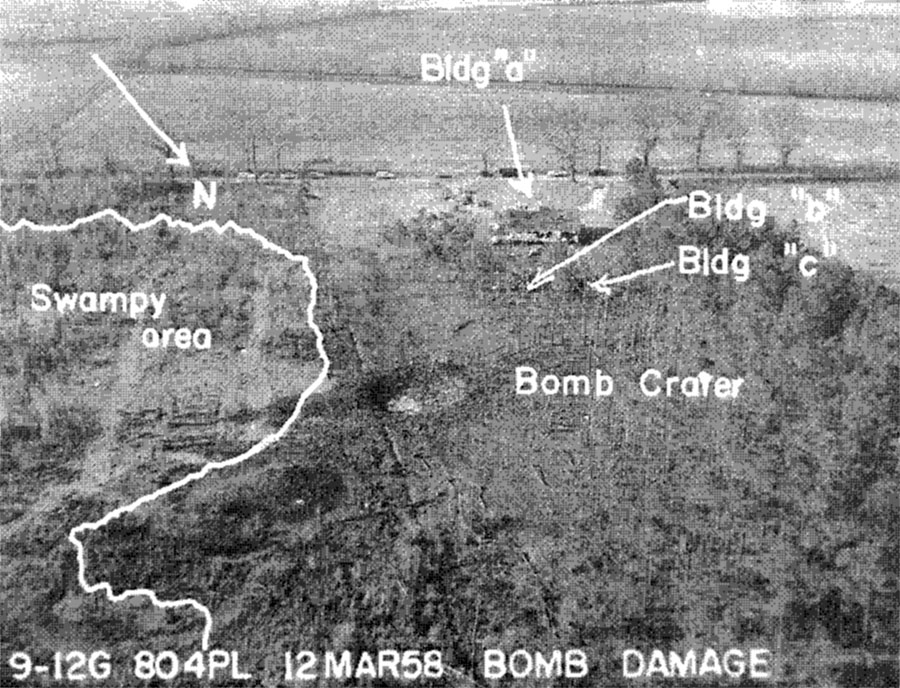
- Aerial view of the impact site, showing the bomb crater and the buildings of the nearby Gregg property

Incident
- Date: March 11, 1958
- Summary: Inadvertent nuclear weapon release
- Site: Mars Bluff, South Carolina; 34°12′3.25″N 79°39′25.66″W

Aircraft
- Aircraft type: Boeing B-47E-LM Stratojet
- Operator: 375th Bombardment Squadron, 308th Bombardment Wing, United States Air Force (USAF)
- Registration: 53-1876A
- Flight origin: Hunter Air Force Base
- Destination: RAF Bruntingthorpe
- Crew: 3
- Fatalities: 0
- Injuries: 6 civilians

The 1958 Mars Bluff B-47 nuclear weapon loss incident was the inadvertent release of a nuclear weapon from a United States Air Force B-47 bomber over Mars Bluff, South Carolina. The bomb, which did not have its fissile nuclear core installed at the time of the accident, impacted with the ground, and its conventional high explosives detonated. The explosion injured six people and caused damage to several buildings in the area. The Air Force was sued by the victims, who received US$54,000, equivalent to $602,595 in 2025.

== Description of incident ==
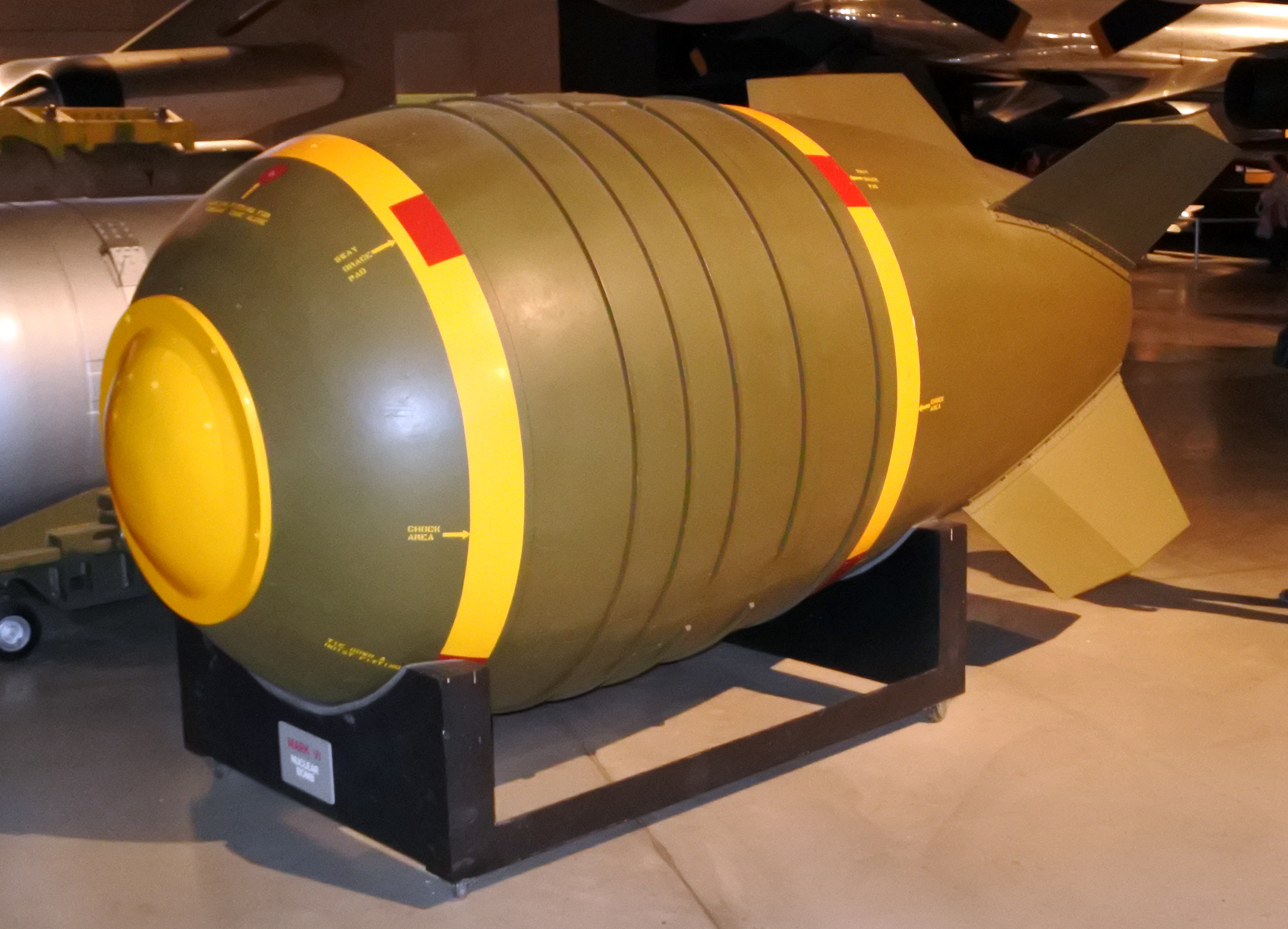
A Mark 6 nuclear bomb, similar to the one dropped in the incident, at the National Museum of the United States Air Force.

On March 11, 1958, a U.S. Air Force Boeing B-47E-LM Stratojet from Hunter Air Force Base operated by the 375th Bombardment Squadron of the 308th Bombardment Wing near Savannah, Georgia, took off at approximately 4:34 PM and was scheduled to fly to the United Kingdom and then to North Africa as part of Operation Snow Flurry. The aircraft was carrying nuclear weapons on board in the event of war with the Soviet Union breaking out. The "nuclear capsule," containing the fissile material needed for a nuclear reaction, was not installed inside of the weapon, but was present elsewhere on the aircraft in a container called a "birdcage".

About 25 minutes after takeoff, Air Force Captain Bruce Kulka, who was the navigator and bombardier, was summoned to the bomb bay area after the captain of the aircraft, Captain Earl Koehler, had encountered a fault light in the cockpit indicating that the bomb harness locking pin did not engage. Kulka made his way to the weapon, which hung on a single shackle. While attempting to insert a steel pin through the shackle, which would prevent the weapon from falling should the electrical lock release, Kulka inadvertently caused the weapon to unhook, and the Mark 6 nuclear bomb fell onto the bomb bay doors of the B-47, forced the doors open, and fell out of the plane at 15,000 ft (4,600 m) of altitude. Kulka managed to not fall out of the open bomb bay. After the pilot heard a rumble, and the co-pilot saw a shock wave from the ground, the bomb bay-doors were closed, and the pilot informed his flight leader that he was aborting the mission and returning to base.

The implosion bomb was "unarmed", in the sense that it did not have its nuclear core installed, and thus could not trigger a nuclear detonation. It still contained around two tons of high explosives, however, and these detonated upon impact with the ground, doing damage to six nearby houses and a church, while leaving a crater about 70 feet (21 m) wide and 35 feet (11 m) deep.

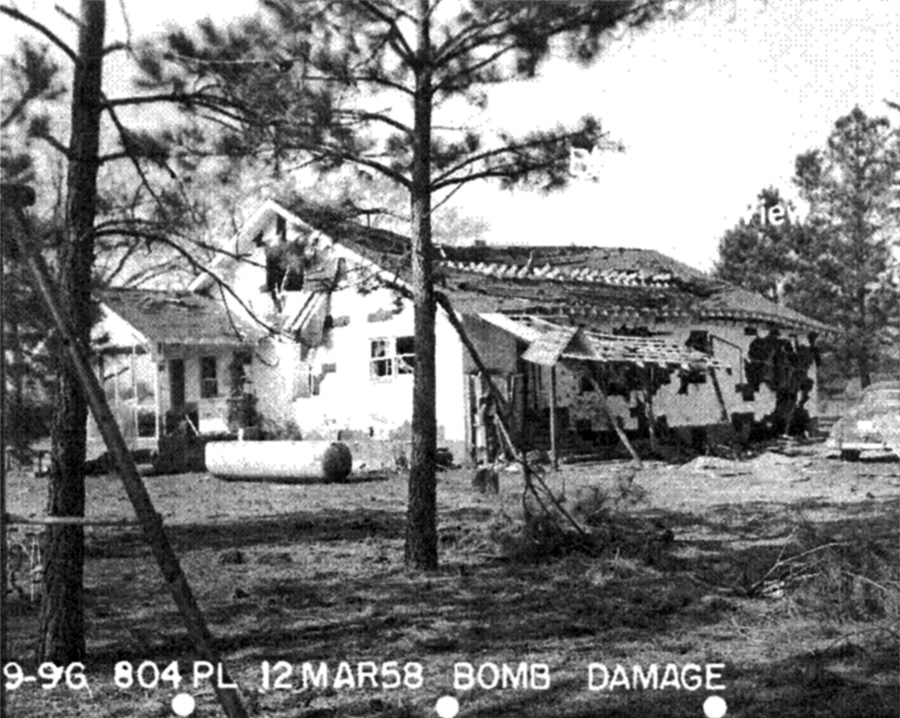
The back of the Gregg house after the detonation.

The exact location of the bomb's impact was in the woods behind the house of a railroad conductor, Walter Gregg, who had served as a paratrooper during World War II. The bomb detonated about 50 yards (46 m) from his garage, where Gregg was working, and about 100 yards (91 m) from his house, where his wife, Effie, was working. In between the two buildings, the Greggs' three children and a niece were playing. Walter Gregg described the accident to The New York Times shortly afterwards:

About five seconds after I saw it go over, there was an explosion. It blew out the side and the top of the garage just as my boy ran inside with me. The timbers were falling around us. There was a green, foggy haze around us and then a big black cloud of smoke. It lasted about thirty seconds. When it cleared up, I looked at the house. The top was blown in, and a side was blown off. I saw the other children on the other side of the house — about 100 yards from where the bomb hit. It sounded just like a big artillery shell or a big conventional bomb. I feel real lucky, for me and my family.

The garage and the house were heavily damaged by the detonation, collapsing around the Greggs. Walter Gregg suffered a deep cut in his right arm, and his wife suffered a cut on her head caused by a dislocated piece of plaster. The Gregg children were hit by flying debris, causing mostly superficial injuries. Their niece required surgery to repair internal bleeding. The Gregg family had about a dozen hens, which were killed. Other children in the area collected "jagged chunks of shiny metal" (debris from the bomb), most of which was later retrieved by Air Force police. After the explosion, another B-47 surveyed the area from above, taking photographs and logging details, and observed ambulances converging on the scene. Air Force technicians cordoned off the area and checked for radioactive contamination from the unenriched uranium tamper of the weapon. It was determined that the level of contamination was low enough that simple washing could remediate the area. The final decontamination was carried out by representatives of the United States Atomic Energy Commission and Los Alamos National Laboratory.

The incident made domestic and international headlines; a US government account called its coverage "extensive at time". The New York Times reported at the time that "it was the first time that an atomic bomb was known to have been dropped in the United States outside nuclear testing grounds", however in fact an accident involving the jettison of a nuclear weapon had occurred only a few weeks earlier in Georgia, and it was at least the 13th serious accident involving an American nuclear weapon at that point. Much of the coverage emphasized the relative safety of U.S. nuclear weapons, explaining that an accidental nuclear explosion could not be easily triggered.

The Gregg family sued the United States Air Force (USAF), and received $54,000 (equivalent to $602,595 in 2025) some five months after the accident. According to Gregg, the crew of the B-47 was transferred overseas immediately after the accident, and he later received letters of apology from them.

The Gregg family appeared on the CBS television program, I've Got a Secret, on the April 2, 1958 episode. Their secret was, “Our house was hit by an atom bomb”.

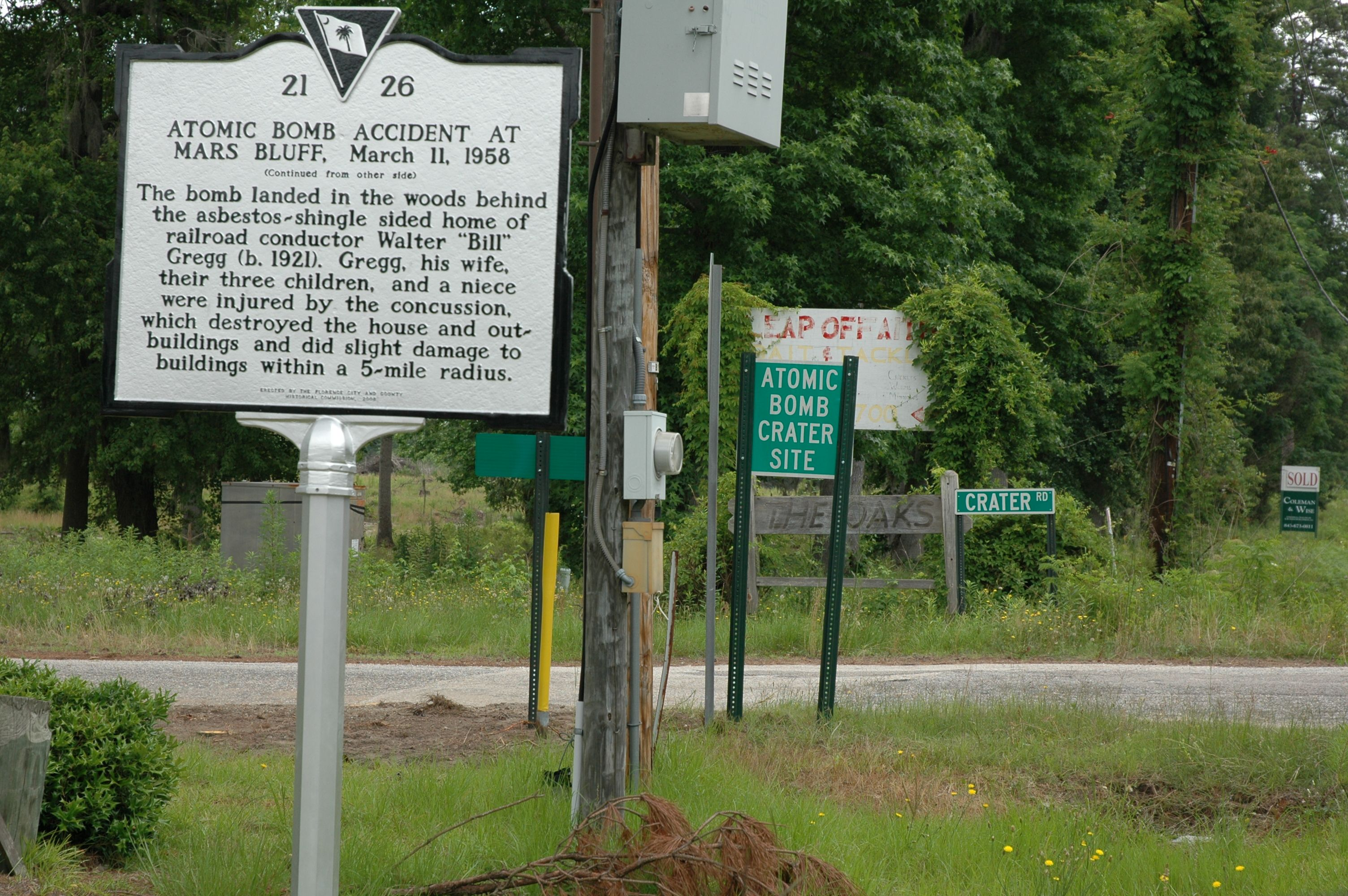
The historical marker erected near the site in 2008.

Following the accident, steps were taken to more securely fasten nuclear weapons while aboard US aircraft, so that it was more difficult to jettison them, accidentally or intentionally. A historical marker was erected near the site of the impact by the Florence City and County Historical Society in 2008. Fragments of the bomb are on display at Florence County Museum.

== See also ==
- List of military nuclear accidents
