= Operation Snow Flurry =

Operation Snow Flurry was an operation by the United States Air Force that consisted of B-47 Stratojet bombers flying from South Carolina to England to perform mock bomb drops. Data would be received on the ground from the planes, and this would later be used to track the accuracy of the mock drops. Aircraft involved would then fly to Strategic Air Command airfields in North Africa. In 1958, a B-47 en route from Hunter Air Force Base accidentally dropped a Mark 6 nuclear bomb over Mars Bluff, South Carolina, which was not nuclear-armed but there was a conventional explosives detonation which damaged nearby buildings. Live bombs were carried on board in case the planes had to activate for a wartime situation, but had their fissile nuclear cores removed and could not cause a nuclear detonation.
