= 1958 Tybee Island mid-air collision =

US Air Force incident involving a nuclear bomb

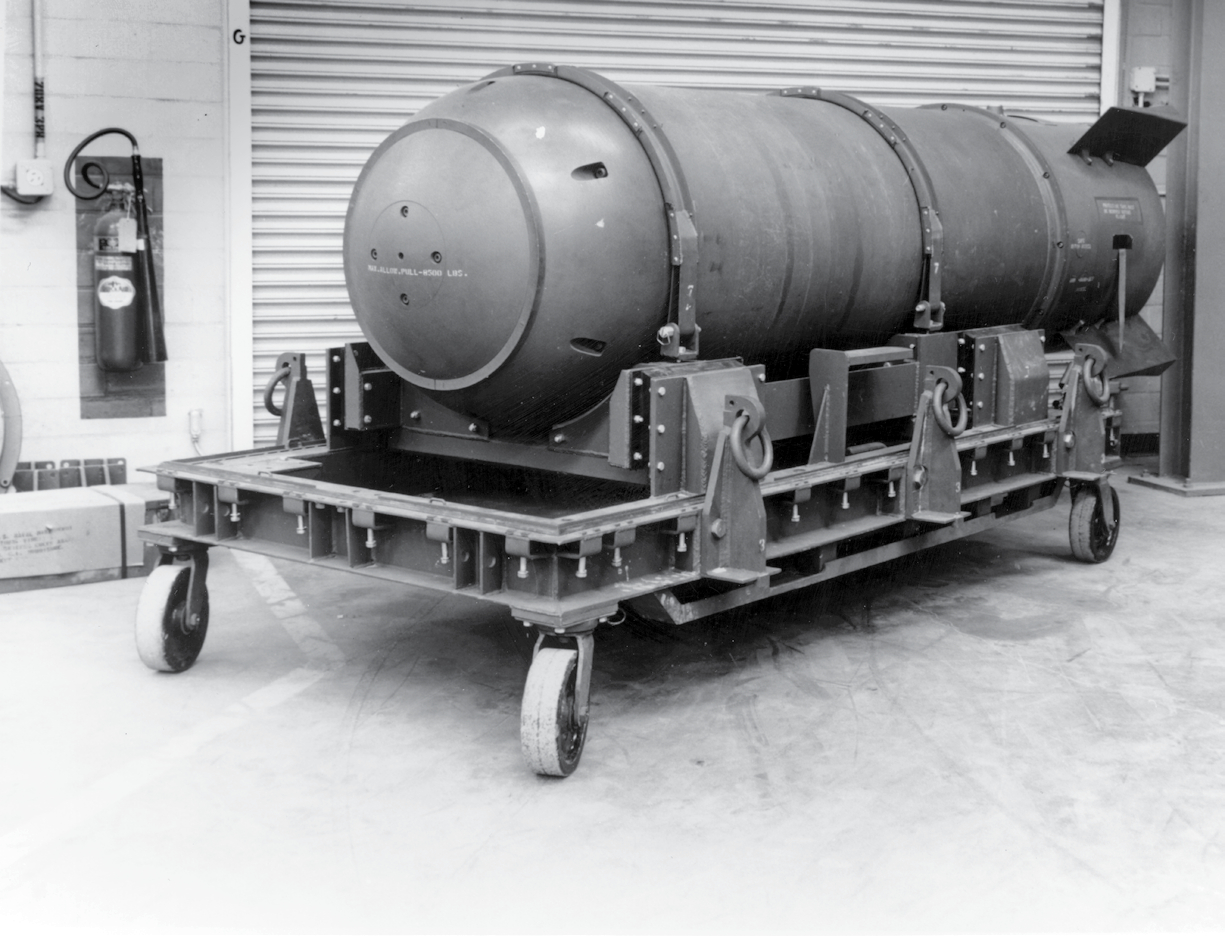
- A Mk 15 nuclear bomb of the type lost when jettisoned after the collision

Accident
- Date: February 5, 1958
- Summary: Mid-air collision
- Site: Tybee Island, Georgia, U.S.; 32°0′N 80°51′W

First aircraft
- Type: Boeing B-47B Stratojet
- Operator: United States Air Force (Strategic Air Command)
- Registration: 51-2349
- Crew: 3
- Fatalities: 0

Second aircraft
- Type: North American F-86L Sabre
- Operator: United States Air Force (Tactical Air Command)
- Registration: 52-10108
- Crew: 1
- Fatalities: 0

The Tybee Island mid-air collision was an incident on February 5, 1958, in which the United States Air Force lost a 7,600-pound (3,400 kg) Mark 15 nuclear bomb in the waters of Tybee Island near Savannah, Georgia, United States. During a night practice exercise, an F-86 fighter plane collided with the B-47 bomber carrying the large weapon.

The bomb was jettisoned to help prevent a crash and explosion. After several unsuccessful searches, the weapon was declared lost in Wassaw Sound off the shores of Tybee Island.

== Collision ==
Georgia

The B-47 bomber was on a simulated combat mission from Homestead Air Force Base in Florida, carrying a single 7,600-pound (3,400 kg) bomb. At about 2:00 a.m. EST (UTC−5), an F-86 fighter collided with the six-engine B-47. The F-86 pilot, Lt. Clarence Stewart, ejected and parachuted to safety near Estill, South Carolina, ten miles (16 km) north of the fighter's crash site east of Sylvania, Georgia. The damaged B-47 remained airborne, plummeting from 38,000 feet (12,000 m) until the pilot, Col. Howard Richardson, regained control at 20,000 feet (6,100 m).

The crew requested permission to jettison the bomb, in order to reduce weight and prevent the weapon from exploding during an emergency landing. Permission was granted, and the bomb was jettisoned at 7,200 feet (2,200 m), while the plane was traveling at about 200 knots (230 mph; 370 km/h). The crew did not see an explosion when the weapon struck the sea. They managed to land the B-47 successfully at nearby Hunter Air Force Base, just south of Savannah. Richardson was awarded the Distinguished Flying Cross for safely landing the bomber.

== The bomb ==
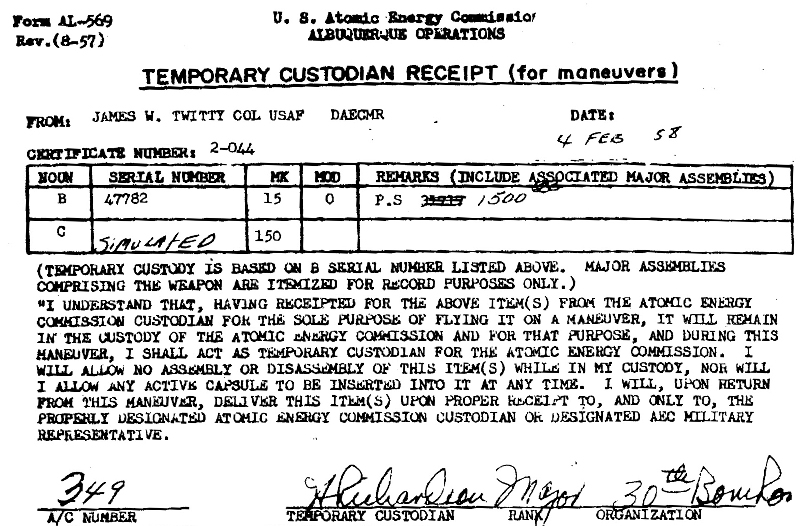
"Temporary Custodian Receipt" for what would be the nuclear weapon lost in the 1958 Tybee Island mid-air collision. It indicates that the core (part "C") was "simulated," and not an actual fissile core of nuclear material.

Some sources describe the bomb as a functional nuclear weapon, but others refer to it as disabled. If it had a plutonium nuclear core installed, it was a fully functional weapon. If it had a dummy core installed, it was incapable of generating a nuclear blast but could still produce a conventional explosion. Twelve feet (3.7 m) in length, the Mark 15 bomb that was lost weighs 7,600 pounds (3,400 kg), bears the serial number 47782, and contains 400 pounds (180 kg) of conventional high explosives and highly enriched uranium.

The Air Force maintains that its "nuclear capsule" (physics package), used to initiate the nuclear reaction, was removed before its flight aboard the B-47. As noted in the Atomic Energy Commission "Form AL-569 Temporary Custodian Receipt (for maneuvers)", signed by the aircraft commander, the bomb contained a simulated 150-pound (68 kg) cap made of lead.

However, according to 1966 congressional testimony by Assistant Secretary of Defense W.J. Howard, the Tybee Island bomb was a "complete weapon, a bomb with a nuclear capsule" and one of two weapons lost that contained a plutonium trigger. Nevertheless, a study of the Strategic Air Command documents indicates that Alert Force test flights in February 1958 with the older Mark 15 payloads were not authorized to fly with nuclear capsules on board. Such approval would not come until safer "sealed-pit nuclear capsule" weapons began to be deployed in June 1958.

== Recovery efforts ==
Starting on February 6, 1958, the Air Force 2700th Explosive Ordnance Disposal Squadron and 100 Navy personnel equipped with hand-held sonar and galvanic drag and cable sweeps mounted a search. On April 16, the military announced the search had been unsuccessful. Based on a hydrographic survey in 2001, the bomb was thought by the Department of Energy to lie buried under 5 to 15 feet (1.5 to 4.6 m) of silt at the bottom of Wassaw Sound.

In 2004, retired Air Force Lt. Colonel Derek Duke claimed to have narrowed the possible resting spot of the bomb down to a small area approximately the size of a football field. He and his partner located the area by trawling in their boat with a Geiger counter in tow. Secondary radioactive particles four times naturally occurring levels were detected and mapped, and the site of radiation origination triangulated. An Air Force nuclear weapons adviser speculated that the source of the radiation was natural, originating from deposits of monazite, a locally occurring mineral that emits radiation.

== Later effects ==
By 2007, no undue levels of unnatural radioactive contamination have been detected in the regional Upper Floridan aquifer by the Georgia Department of Natural Resources (over and above the already high levels thought to be due to monazite).

== In popular culture ==
In February 2015, an article appeared on a fake news web site which claimed that the bomb had been found by vacationing Canadian divers and had been removed from the bay. The spurious story spread widely via social media.

In the Dirk Pitt novel Odessa Sea by Clive Cussler and Dirk Cussler, Dirk Pitt mentions that the bomb was found by some sport divers a few years ago.

In the MonsterVerse graphic novel Godzilla Dominion, the Titan named Scylla finds the sunken warhead off the coast of Savannah, Georgia, having sensed its radiation as a potential food source. Godzilla and the Coast Guard force Scylla to retreat, and they safely recover the bomb.

== See also ==
- Broken Arrow
- List of military nuclear accidents
