= Soviet submarine K-171 =

Nuclear ballistic missile submarine

History

Soviet Union → Russia
- Name: K-171
- Builder: Sevmash, Severodvinsk
- Launched: 1976
- Commissioned: 1976
- Decommissioned: 2003
- Fate: Broken up

General characteristics
- Class & type: Delta-class submarine
- Displacement: 9000 m³ (8,900 t (8,759 long tons)) surfaced; 10500m³ (13,700 long tons (13,920 t)) submerged
- Length: 139 m (456 ft 0 in)
- Beam: 12 m (39 ft 4 in)
- Draft: 9 m (29 ft 6 in)
- Propulsion: 2 × VM-4B PWRs generating 90 MW each; 2 × steam turbines producing 52,000 hp (39 MW) each
- Speed: 12 knots (22 km/h; 14 mph) surfaced; 25 knots (46 km/h; 29 mph) submerged
- Endurance: 80 days
- Test depth: 390 m (1,280 ft) designed; 450 m (1,480 ft) maximum
- Complement: 120 officers and men
- Armament: D-9 launch system with 12 R-29 Vysota SLBM; 4 × 21 in (533 mm) torpedo tubes

Service record
- Part of: Soviet Pacific Fleet

K-171 was a Project 667B Murena (Delta I by NATO) nuclear ballistic missile submarine of the Soviet Navy. The submarine was launched and commissioned in 1976. The submarine transferred from the Soviet Northern Fleet later that year to the Pacific.

== Reactor incident ==
On December 28, 1978, while in the Pacific Ocean, K-171 had a reactor failure. Radiation exposure resulted in the deaths of three crew members on board.

== Retirement ==
Like most Soviet Delta I and Delta II-class submarines that were in service after the Cold War, the submarine was scrapped to comply with new treaties. It was decommissioned from the Russian Navy in 2003.
