= Hunter Army Airfield =

Military airfield near Hinesville, Georgia, US

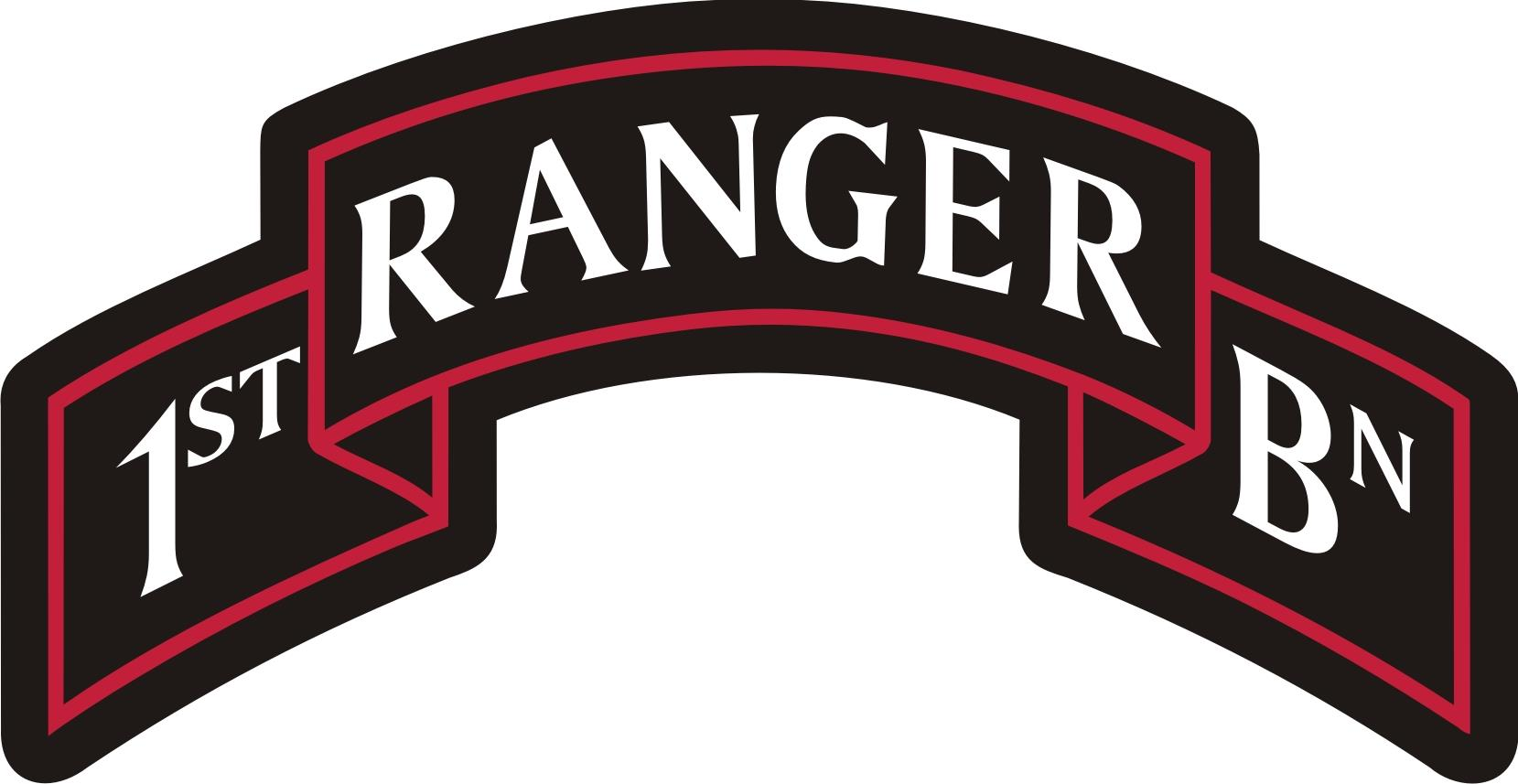
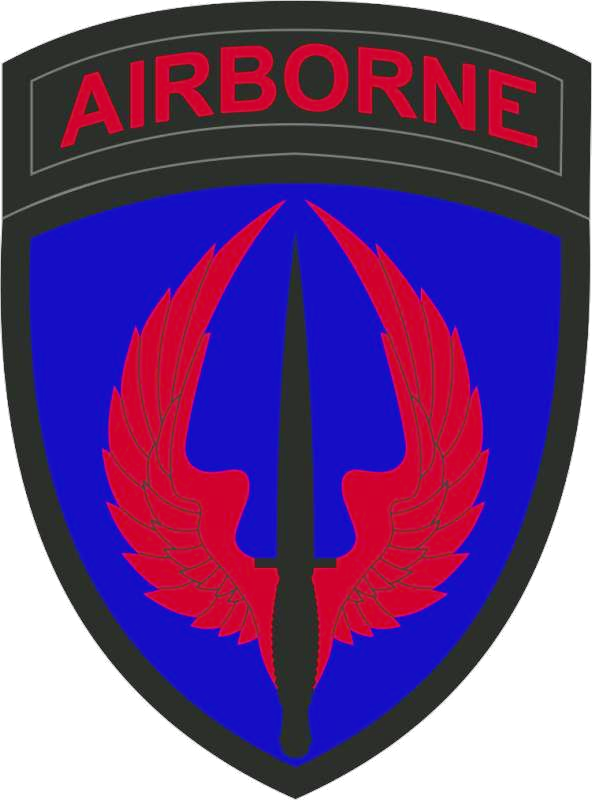
Hunter Army Airfield
- Part of Fort Stewart
- Savannah, Georgia in USA
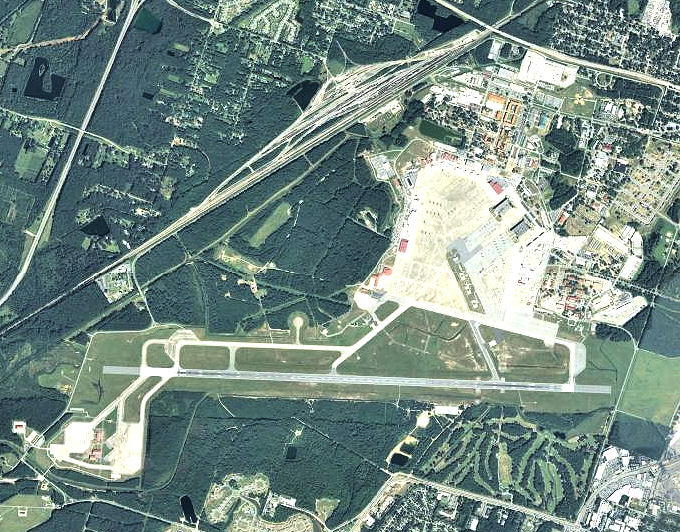
- 2006 USGS airphoto

Site information
- Owner: Department of Defense
- Operator: United States Army
- Website: Official website

Location
- Shown within Georgia KSVN (Georgia)
- Coordinates: 32°00′36″N 081°08′44″W

Site history
- Built: 1929; 97 years ago
- In use: 1929 - present

Garrison information
- Current commander: Lt. Col. Bob Cuthbertson
- Occupants: 3rd Infantry Division; United States Coast Guard; 1st Battalion, 75th Ranger Regiment; 3rd Battalion, 160th Special Operations Aviation Regiment (Airborne)

Airfield information
- Identifiers: IATA: SVN, ICAO: KSVN, FAA LID: SVN
- Elevation: 12 metres (39 ft) AMSL
Runways
Direction	Length and surface
10/28	3,467 metres (11,375 ft) Asphalt

Hunter Army Airfield (IATA: SVN, ICAO: KSVN, FAA LID: SVN), located in Savannah, Georgia, United States, is a military airfield and subordinate installation to Fort Stewart located in Hinesville, Georgia.

Hunter features a runway that is 11,375 feet (3,467 m) long and an aircraft parking area that is more than 350 acres (1.4 km^{2}). The runway and apron, combined with the 72,000 ft^{2} (6,700 m^{2}) Arrival/Departure Airfield Control Group (A/DACG) Facility and nearby railhead, allow the 3rd Infantry Division from nearby Fort Stewart to efficiently deploy soldiers and cargo worldwide. NASA identified Hunter as an alternate landing site for the Space Shuttle orbiters.

== Tenants ==
Currently, Hunter Army Airfield has approximately 5,500 soldiers, airmen, coast guardsmen and Marines on station. It is home of the aviation units of the 3rd Infantry Division (Mechanized) headquartered at Fort Stewart. There are also a number of non-divisional units assigned to Hunter as well.

- U.S. Army
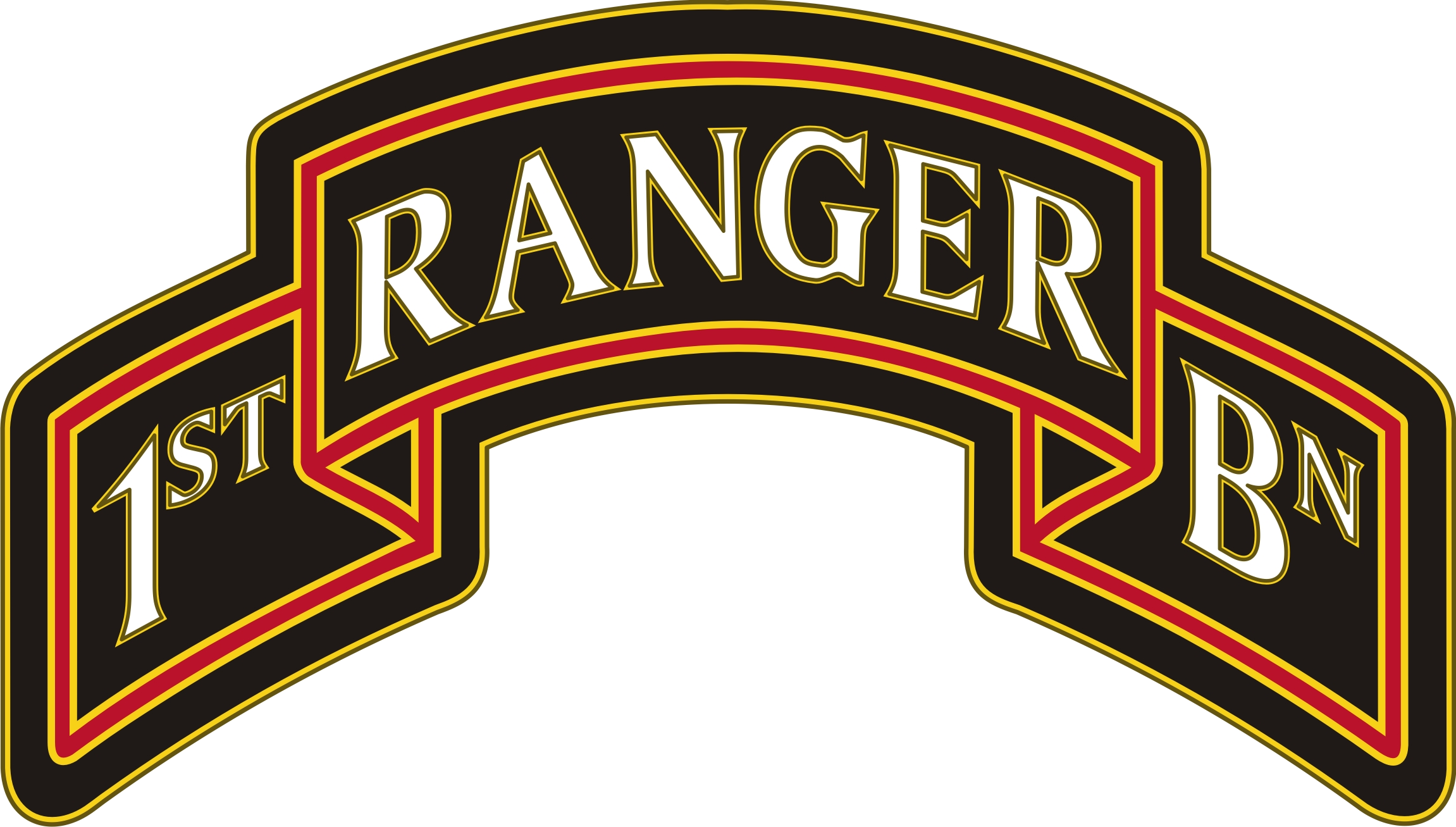
  - 1st Battalion, 75th Ranger Regiment
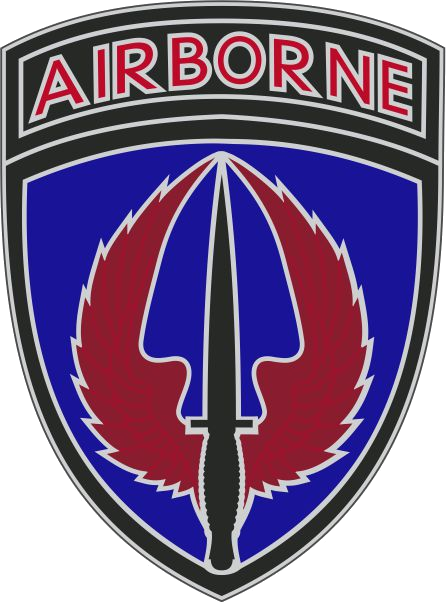
  - 3rd Battalion, 160th Special Operations Aviation Regiment (Airborne)
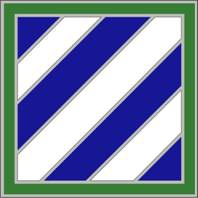
  - 3rd Infantry Division
    - Combat Aviation Brigade (CAB) "Falcon"
    - CAB's HHC "Talons"
    - 2nd Battalion (General Support), 3rd Aviation Regiment (UH-60A/UH-60L/CH-47) "Knighthawk"
    - 4th Battalion (Assault), 3rd Aviation Regiment (UH-60M) "Brawler"
    - 3rd Squadron, 17th Cavalry Regiment (AH-64D/AH-64DW) "Lighthorse"
    - 603rd Aviation Support Battalion (ASB) "Work Horse"
  - 224th Military Intelligence Battalion (Aerial Exploitation)
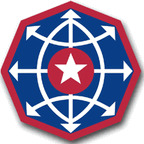
  - 3rd MP Group (CID), United States Army Criminal Investigation Division
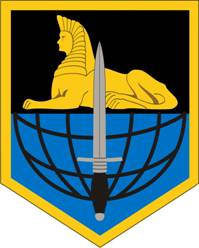
  - Savannah Field Office (Counterintelligence), 308th Military Intelligence Battalion
- U.S. Air Force
  - Operating Location-A, Detachment 3, 18th Weather Squadron (USAF)
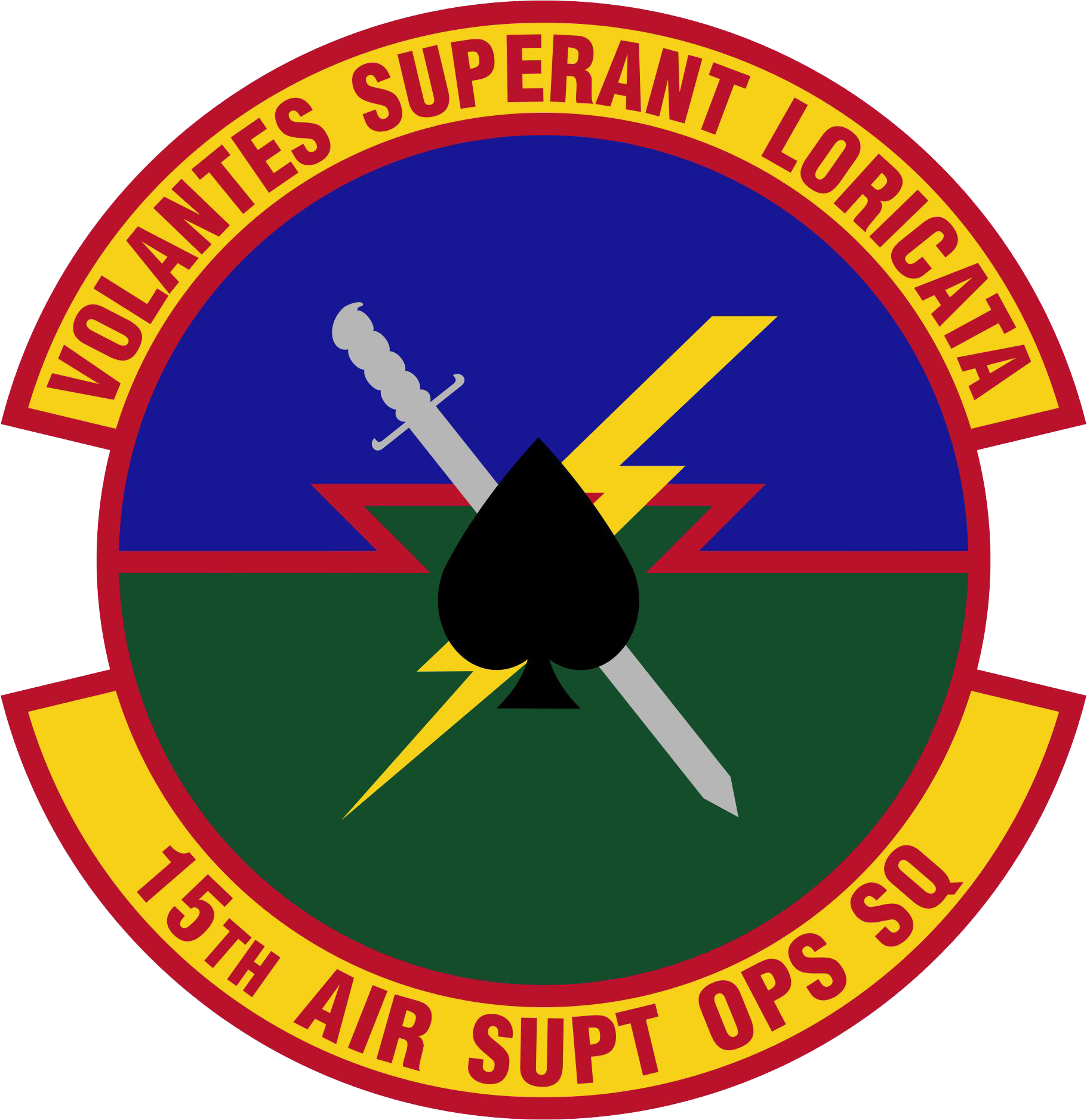
  - 15th Air Support Operations Squadron (USAF)
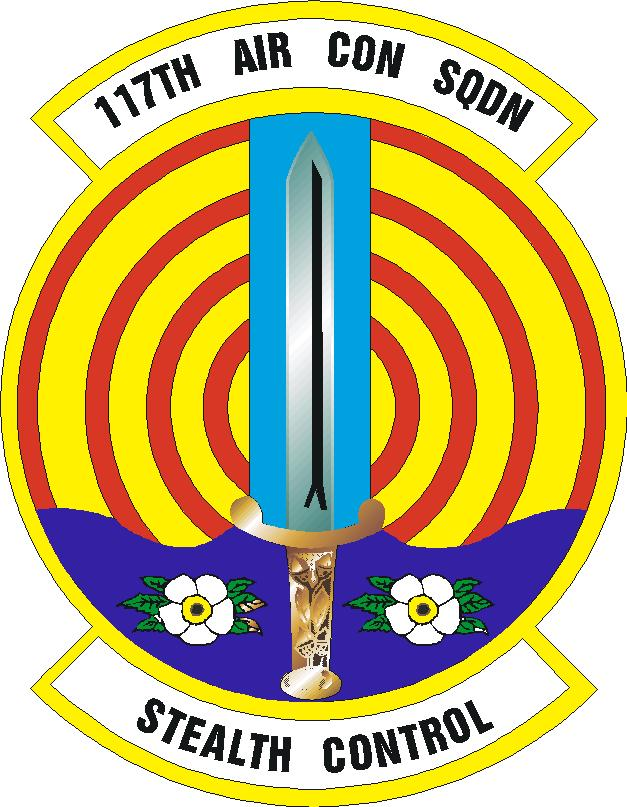
  - 117th Air Control Squadron (USAF / Georgia Air National Guard)
- U.S. Marine Corps
  - Landing Support Company, Combat Logistics Regiment 45 USMC

Coast Guard Air Station Savannah

Coast Guard Air Station Savannah is also located on Hunter Army Airfield. Equipped with Eurocopter MH-65 Dolphin helicopters, Air Station Savannah provides the Savannah area, Coastal Georgia and South Carolina with round-the-clock search and rescue coverage of the area, to include both inland waters and off shore areas. They also provide security to the shores and borders with specialized Coast Guard sniper units.

== History ==
=== Origins ===
In 1929, the General Aviation Committee of the Savannah City Council recommended that the 730 acres (3.0 km^{2}) Belmont Tract, belonging to J. C. Lewis, be accepted by the council as the future site of the Savannah Municipal Airport. The cost of the land was $35,000. By September 1929, the runway and several buildings were ready and the city officially opened the new facility, known as Savannah Municipal Airport.

The airport became a part of Eastern Air Transport Incorporated air route on 2 December 1931, when Ida Hoynes, daughter of the Mayor, Thomas M. Hoynes, broke a bottle of Savannah River water on a propeller blade of an 18-passenger Curtiss Condor II during the christening ceremony.

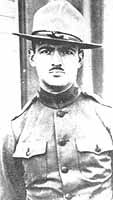
Frank O. Hunter

The airport was named Hunter Municipal Airfield during Savannah Aviation Week in May 1940, in honor of Lieutenant Colonel (Lt. Col.) Frank O'Driscoll Hunter, a native of Savannah and a World War I flying ace. Lt. Col. Hunter was not scheduled to appear in Savannah that week; However, he paid a surprise visit to the field on the first day of Aviation Week while en route to France to serve as a United States Military Air Attaché.

=== Savannah Army Air Base ===
On 30 August 1940, the United States Army Air Corps received approval to build a base at Hunter Municipal Airfield. Official dedication of the airfield as Savannah Army Air Base took place 19 February 1941. The Army Air Corps assigned Savannah AAB initially to the Southeast Air District (later Third Air Force), III Air Support Command.

The 27th Bombardment Group, equipped with Douglas B-18 Bolo medium bombers was the first assigned unit to the new airfield. The 27th was reassigned to the field from Barksdale Field, Louisiana. The group consisted of the 15th, 16th and 17th Bombardment Squadrons. In 1941, the group was reequipped with Douglas A-24 Banshee Dive Bombers, and on 21 October 1941 the group was ordered to the Philippine Islands in response to the growing crisis in the Pacific. The 27th returned to Hunter, without personnel or equipment on 4 May 1942 after being severely depleted in strength during the Battle of the Philippines (1942), and subsequent combat in the Dutch East Indies and New Guinea Campaigns (1942). The unit was reequipped with A-20 Havocs, remanned and retrained at Hunter. It was then deployed for combat with Twelfth Air Force in North Africa in July 1942.

During early 1942 after the Pearl Harbor Attack, Savannah AAB became a base for several Antisubmarine groups and squadrons of I Bomber Command and later Army Air Forces Antisubmarine Command with a mission to patrol the Atlantic coast, locate and attack German U-boats.

Throughout 1942, light bomber and dive bomber groups received combat training at Savannah AAB before being deployed to the combat zones overseas. These groups included the:

- 85th Bombardment Group (Light), 9 June – 15 August 1942
- 86th Bombardment Group (Light), 20 June – 7 August 1942
- 311th Bombardment Group (Light), 4 July – 22 October 1942
- 339th Bombardment Group (Dive), 10 August 1942 – 6 February 1943

With the U-boat mission taken over by the Navy after mid-1943, Savannah AAB became a training base for Martin B-26 Marauder medium bomber crews. Marauder groups which received final combat training were:

- 344th Bombardment Group (Medium), 19 December 1943 – 26 January 1944
- 397th Bombardment Group (Medium), 1 November 1943 – 13 March 1944

At the end of the war, Savannah AAB was used as a Separation Center for the discharge and furlough of service members returning from Europe. In June 1946, the airfield was returned to the City of Savannah.

From 1946 to 1949, many of its buildings were leased to industrial plants. Some of the buildings were used as apartment houses, and an orphanage was located in the former commanding officer's quarters. The University of Georgia established an extension campus on part of the old base, as well.

=== United States Air Force ===
On 1 March 1949, Chatham Air Force Base, located eight miles (13 km) northwest of Savannah, was reopened by the United States Air Force Strategic Air Command. The 2d Bombardment Group was reassigned from Davis-Monthan AFB, Arizona to Chatham, with the B-50 Superfortress. The limited facilities at Chatham made the base unfit for permanent use. Plans were made to close the base and move the B-50s to more suitable facilities. Rather than see the Air Force move elsewhere, Savannah offered to exchange airfields with the federal government along with 3,500 acres (14 km^{2}) of additional land around Hunter for future base expansions. This arrangement was agreed upon and on 29 September 1950, the 2d Bomb Group moved to the base, reopened as Hunter Air Force Base and Chatham was turned over to the City of Savannah. At the time, Hunter AFB became the only U.S. military installation named for a living American, Major General (Retired) Frank Hunter.

==== Strategic Air Command ====
Hunter AFB was assigned to the Strategic Air Command's (SAC) Second Air Force. Two major SAC medium bombardment wings were assigned to Hunter during the 1950s. Both came under the 38th Air Division which was also headquartered at Hunter.

- 2nd Bombardment Wing, 22 September 1950 – 1 April 1963

The 2d Bomb Wing was the host unit at Hunter from the time the base reopened in 1950 until SAC left in 1963. It was initially equipped with B-50 Superfortress heavy bombers, being replaced by the B-47 Stratojet in 1953. From Hunter, the 2d Bomb Wing frequently deployed to SAC bases, primarily in the United Kingdom on Operation Reflex deployments where it came under control of the 7th Air Division. The limited range of the B-47 made it critical to locate it close to bases near Eastern Europe and the Soviet Union in case of war. With the phaseout of the B-47 beginning in the early 1960s, the Wing moved to Barksdale AFB, Louisiana in 1963 where it was reequipped with B-52s and remains to this day.

- 308th Bombardment Wing, 17 April 1952 – 15 July 1959

The 308th Bomb Wing was a second B-47 Wing assigned to Hunter. The 308th deployed primarily to SAC bases in Morocco on Reflex deployments where it came under the control of the 5th Air Division. The closing of USAF bases in Morocco in 1959 led to the wing being reassigned to Plattsburgh AFB, New York as a KC-97 Stratofreighter wing, and later as a Titan II Strategic Missile Wing at Little Rock AFB, Arkansas in 1962.

On 11 March 1958, a B-47E which departed Hunter on a simulated combat mission accidentally dropped a Mark 6 fission bomb minus its nuclear component near Florence, South Carolina. A home was destroyed and several people were injured. The aircraft was taking part in Operation Snow Flurry at the time of the incident.

==== Military Air Transport Service ====
The phaseout of SAC Medium Bomber (B-47 Wings) in the early 1960s resulted in SAC leaving Hunter in 1963. The base was reassigned to the Military Air Transport Service (MATS). The MATS Eastern Transport Air Force 63d Troop Carrier Wing, Heavy was assigned to Hunter from Donaldson AFB, South Carolina which was closing. From Hunter, the 63d flew the C-124 Globemaster II intercontinental cargo aircraft to points around the world.

==== Air Defense Command ====
Beginning in 1955 Air Defense Command designated Hunter AFB as part of a planned deployment of forty-four Phase I Mobile Radar stations. It was one of twenty-nine stations which were sited around the perimeter of the country to support the permanent ADC network of seventy-five stations. The ADC radar site at Hunter was given designation M-112.

On 1 March 1955 the 702d Aircraft Control and Warning Squadron began operating AN/MPS-7, AN/TPS-10D, and AN/MPS-14 radars at Hunter, and initially the station functioned as a Ground-Control Intercept (GCI) and warning station. As a GCI station, the squadron's role was to guide interceptor aircraft toward unidentified intruders picked up on the unit's radar scopes. From 1956 to 1958, an AN/GPS-3 also saw service. By 1959 only AN/FPS-20A and AN/MPS-14 sets were operating. Circa 1961 Hunter received an AN/FPS-26 height-finder radar.

During late 1961 Hunter AFB joined the Semi Automatic Ground Environment (SAGE) system, feeding data to DC-09 at Gunter AFB, Alabama. After joining, the squadron was re-designated as the 702d Radar Squadron (SAGE) on 1 February 1962. The radar squadron provided information 24/7 the SAGE Direction Center where it was analyzed to determine range, direction altitude speed and whether or not aircraft were friendly or hostile. Later that year, the AN/FPS-20A was upgraded to become an AN/FPS-67, and on 31 July 1963, the site was redesignated as NORAD ID Z-112. The AN/FPS-67 was upgraded to an AN/FPS-67B in 1966, and the AN/MPS-14 was removed in 1968.

In addition to the main facility, Air Defense Command at Hunter operated three unmanned AN/FPS-18 Gap Filler sites:

- MCAS Parris Island, SC (M-112A): 32°19′42″N 080°42′21″W
- Alma, GA (M-112C): 31°36′30″N 082°32′48″W
- Jeffersonville, GA (M-112E): 32°33′45″N 083°23′32″W

When Hunter AFB was transferred to the US Army in 1967 becoming Hunter Army Airfield, the radar site was renamed Savannah Air Force Station (AFS) . The 702nd Radar Squadron continued routine operations for many years, and, the equipment at the station was upgraded or modified to improve the efficiency and accuracy of the information gathered by the radars.

The station was deactivated on 5 June 1979.

=== United States Army Airfield ===
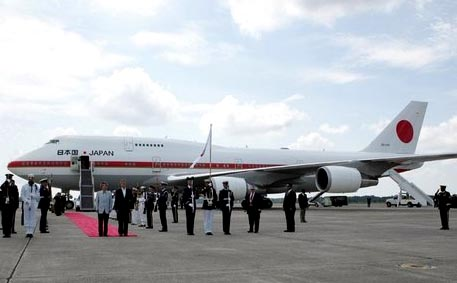
Japanese Air Force One at Hunter Army Airfield in 2004.

In 1964, the Department of Defense announced that the base would be closed, along with 94 other military installations. The Air Force was given a period of three years to phase out operations.

In December 1966, at the height of the Vietnam War, the Department of the Army announced that the Secretary of Defense had approved an increase in the number of Army helicopter pilots to be trained. At the time, the United States Army Aviation School at Fort Rucker, Alabama was operating at capacity and additional facilities were needed. Hunter Air Force Base was turned over to the Army and operated in conjunction with Fort Stewart, located 45 miles (72 km) southwest of Hunter.

Brigadier General Frank Meszar, Commanding General of Fort Stewart, formally accepted the base from Colonel James A. Evans Jr., Commander of Hunter AFB, in a formal change of command and service ceremony on 1 April 1967, at which point the facility was renamed Hunter Army Air Field (Hunter AAF). The headquarters of the Army Aviation School Element moved to Hunter from Fort Stewart, where it had been established during the summer of 1966. The element's mission was to coordinate the training of fixed-wing and rotary-wing aviators as an extension of the Army's training programs at Fort Rucker and Fort Wolters, Texas.

On 28 July 1967, the combined facilities of Fort Stewart and Hunter Army Airfield were re-designated the United States Army Flight Training Center. Included was the Attack Helicopter Training Department ("Cobra Hall"), the Army's first attack helicopter school whose purpose was to train pilots in the AH-1G Cobra, the world's first purpose-built attack helicopter. The first class of Republic of Vietnam Air Force students began Advanced helicopter training at Hunter on 13 March 1969. As the number of Vietnamese flight students increased, flight training for U.S. Army officers and warrant officers at Hunter was gradually phased out, ending on 16 June 1970.

In 1973, Hunter AAF was deactivated, but it was later reopened in 1975, serving as a support facility for the 24th Infantry Division (Mechanized), at Fort Stewart. The 24th Infantry Division, or Victory Division, became part of the nation's Rapid Deployment Force on 1 October 1980. The Victory Division's ability to deploy on short notice was enhanced by its large runway (the Army's longest runway east of the Mississippi River), Savannah's deep-water port facility and excellent rail and road networks.

Military jet and turboprop aircraft based at Moody AFB, Robins AFB, Dobbins ARB and Savannah ANGB in Georgia; NAS Jacksonville and Jacksonville ANGB in Florida; and MCAS Beaufort, Charleston AFB and Shaw AFB in South Carolina also continue to make regular use of Hunter AAF's long runway for local training, to include practice approaches and landings.

== See also ==
- Georgia World War II Army Airfields
- United States general surveillance radar stations
