= Mars Bluff, South Carolina =

- Unincorporated community
- Location within South Carolina Location within the United States
- Coordinates: 34°12′20″N 79°39′19″W
- Country: United States
- State: South Carolina
- County: Florence County
- Elevation: 98 ft (30 m)
- Time zone: UTC-5 (Eastern (EST))
  - Summer (DST): UTC-4 (EDT)
- ZIP code: 29506
- Area codes: 843, 854
- GNIS feature ID: 1246538

Mars Bluff is an unincorporated community in Florence County, South Carolina, United States that bears the distinction of having been inadvertently bombed with a nuclear weapon by the United States Air Force.

== History ==
Originally known as Marr's Bluff during the American Revolution, the area west of the Great Pee Dee River eventually became known as Mars Bluff at some point before the American Civil War. Near the end of the American Civil War, the Mars Bluff Naval Yard was established, one of many inland Confederate naval yards.

== Nuclear bomb accident ==
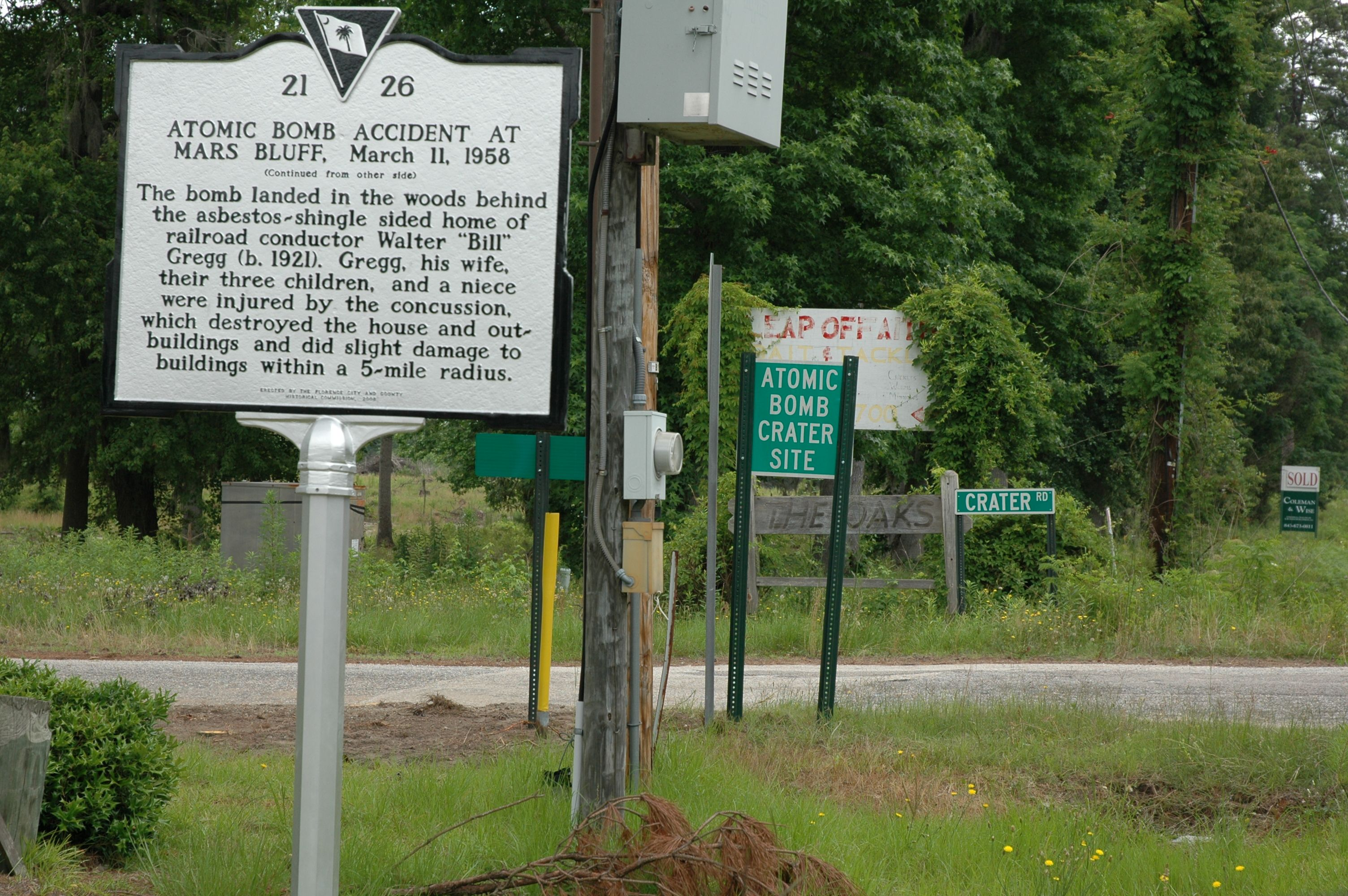
Historical marker and access sign

On March 11, 1958 a U.S. Air Force B-47 Stratojet with a nuclear payload, which did not have its fissile nuclear core installed at the time of the accident, left for nuclear training exercises for war preparations in the United Kingdom and South Africa. While attempting to secure the weapon after a warning light went on in the cabin, the navigator mistakenly caused it to be released, and it crashed onto the bomb bay doors, opening them and continuing downward. Although the bomb was not armed with its nuclear core (which was stored separately on the plane), it contained several tons of high explosives. Upon impacting with the ground, these high explosives detonated caused a large explosion, creating a crater estimated to be 75 feet (23 m) wide and 25–35 feet (7.6–10.7 m) deep. It landed approximately 50 yards from the house and garage of Walter Gregg. The blast injured Gregg, his wife, his three children, and his niece. It destroyed his house, damaged several other nearby houses and a church, and killed Gregg's chickens. The site is located near US 301, but is difficult to access due to the site being on private property. Fragments of the bomb are on display at Florence County Museum.
