= Mark 39 nuclear bomb =

Thermonuclear warhead

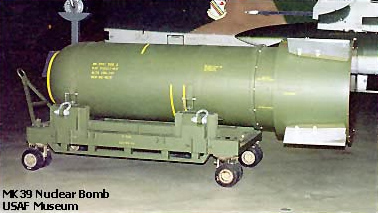
Mark 39 Mod 2 nuclear bomb

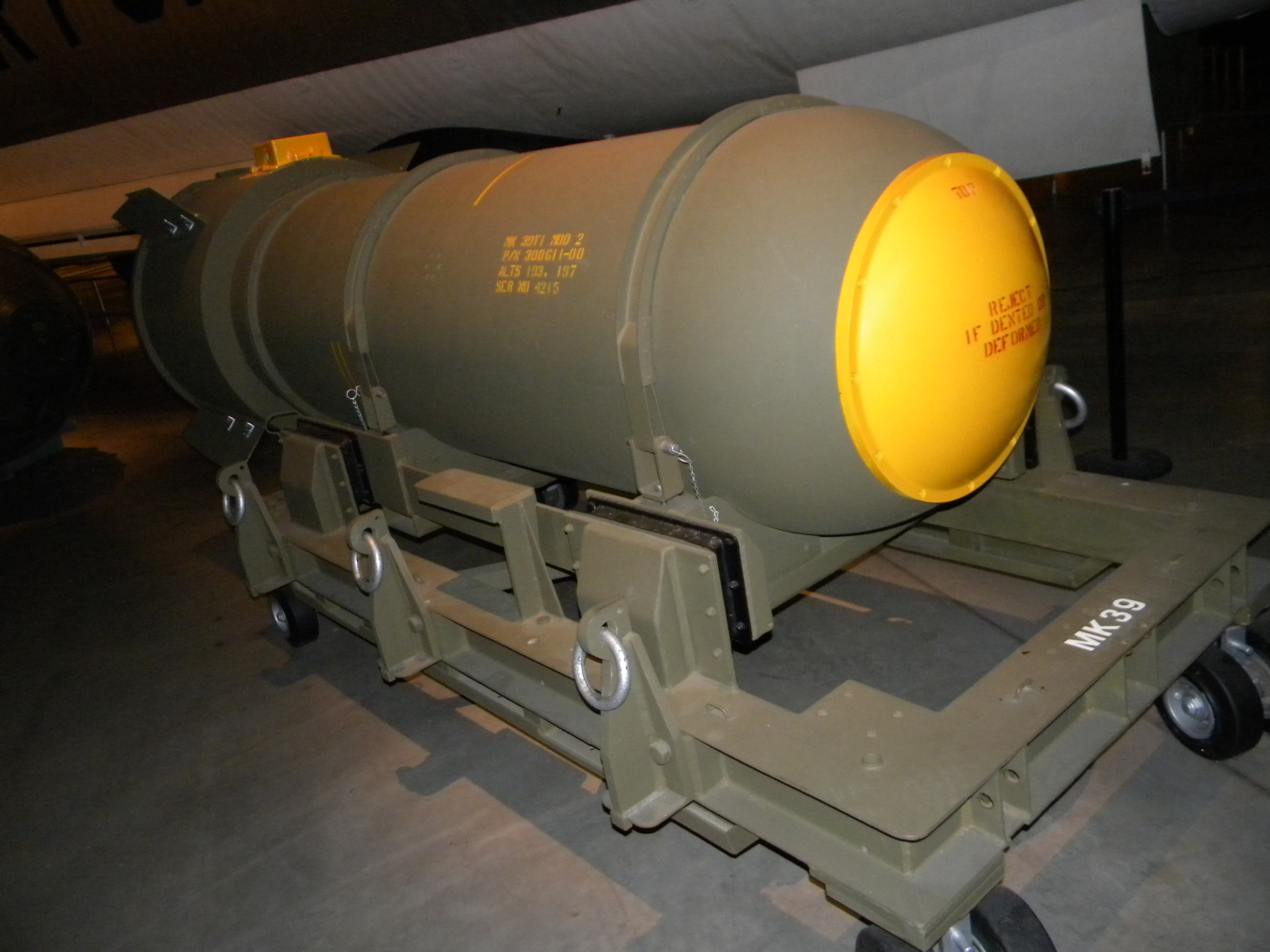
Mark 39 Mod 2 nuclear bomb on display at the National Museum of the United States Air Force. The nose plate containing the contact fuze states: "REJECT IF DENTED OR DEFORMED."

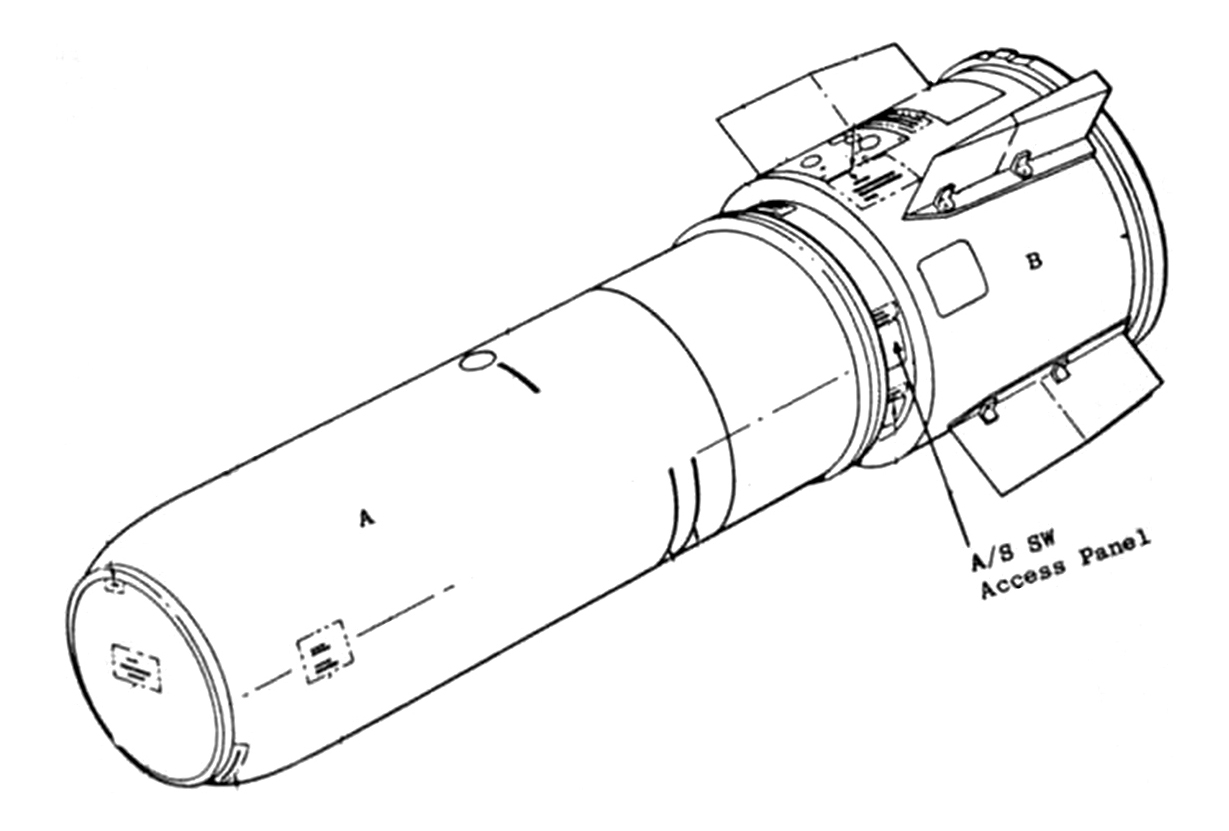
A diagram of the external features of the Mark 39 Mod 2 casing, showing the forward section containing the warhead (A), the rear section containing the parachute pack (B), and the location of the Arm/Safe Switch access panel.

The Mark 39 nuclear bomb and W39 nuclear warhead were versions of an American thermonuclear weapon, which were in service from 1957 to 1966.

The Mark 39 design was a thermonuclear bomb and had a yield of 3.8 megatons. It weighed 6,500–6,750 pounds (2,950–3,060 kilograms), and was about 11 feet, 8 inches long (3.556 meters) with a diameter of 35 inches (89 cm). The design is an improved Mark 15 nuclear bomb design (the TX-15-X3 design and Mark 39 Mod 0 were the same design). The Mark 15 was the first lightweight US thermonuclear bomb.

The W39 warhead was 35 inches (89 cm) in diameter and 106 inches (270 cm) long, with a weight of 6,230 pounds (2,830 kg) to 6,400 pounds (2,900 kg). It was essentially identical to the Mark 39 bomb, but lacked its parachute, fins, and "false" nose. It was used on the SM-62 Snark missile, PGM-11 Redstone short-range ballistic missile, and in the B-58 Hustler weapons pod. It was designated as a possible warhead to use in the SM-64 Navaho missile prior to the latter's cancellation. A lower-yield variant of the Mark 39 was developed for use with the Redstone missile. Sources indicated it may have been as low as 425 kilotons, or as high as 500 kilotons.

A total of 700 Mark 39 bombs (of three "mod" variants) were produced between February 1957 and March 1959. Retirement of the Mark 39 began in January 1962 and concluded in November 1966. 60 W39 warheads were produced for the Redstone missile and stockpiled between 1958 and 1963, and 30 W39 warheads were produced for the Snark missile in 1958 and retired between August 1962 and September 1965.

== Variants ==
=== Mark 39 Mod 0 ===
The Mark 39 Mod 0 bomb was an offshoot of proposals to improve the Mark 15 nuclear bomb. The Mk 39 Mod 0 differed from the Mark 15 in that it used contact fuzes instead of proximity fuzes, and it had thermal batteries instead of nickel-cadmium batteries. It also weighed about 1,000 pounds (450 kg) less. It had a true contact-burst capability along with a barometric fuze option for airbursts that could be chosen in flight (with the contact-burst serving as a backup capability in that case). It had an in-flight insertion (IFI) system.

=== Mark 39 Mod 1 ===
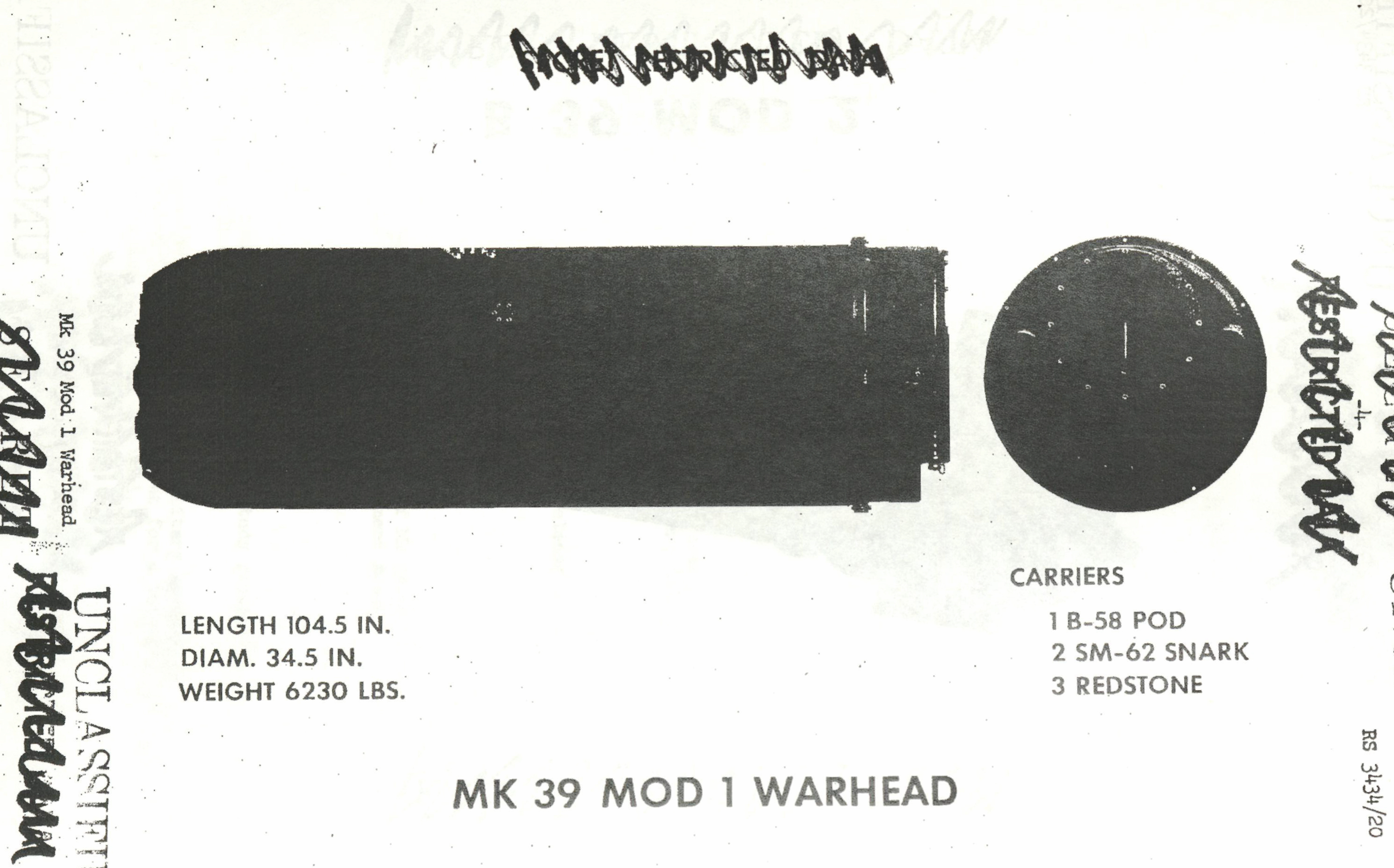
External appearance of the Mark 39 Mod 1 warhead.

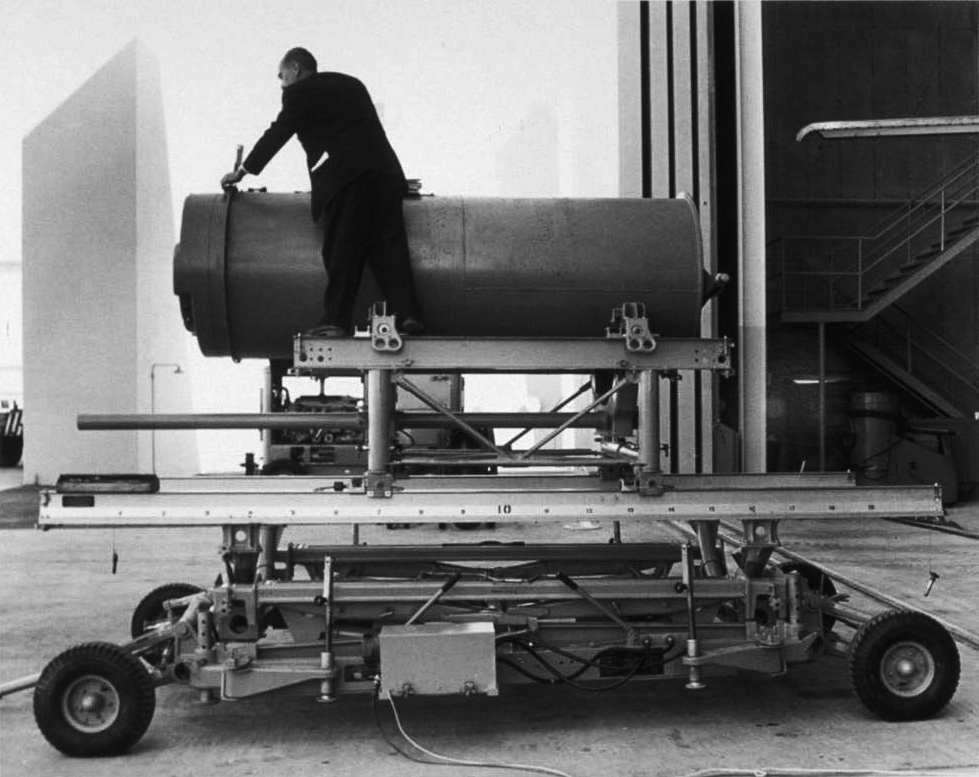
A dummy W39 warhead being loaded into a SM-62 Snark missile.

The Mark 39 Mod 1 notably used a boosted, sealed-pit core, eliminating the IFI system. This "reduced weapon weight, lowered power requirements, and resulted in the use of smaller and lighter batteries." It also was adaptable into a warhead (the W39) which would eventually be adaptable to a B-58 Hustler external weapons pod, the SM-62 Snark missile, and the PGM-11 Redstone missile. As the weapon now always contained all components needed to fire it, several safety systems were added to avoid inadvertent detonation, including safing pins that would hold in the arming rods, arming rods that required considerable force to pull, and a high-voltage safing switch to prevent detonation in the event that fire or extreme heat igniting the high-voltage batteries.

The pit of the "primary" stage of both Mark 39 Mods 1 and 2 was entirely made of enriched uranium ("all-oralloy") and known as VIPER II. Test "Lacrosse" of Operation Redwing was of this primary system and yielded 40 kilotons.

=== Mark 39 Mod 2 ===
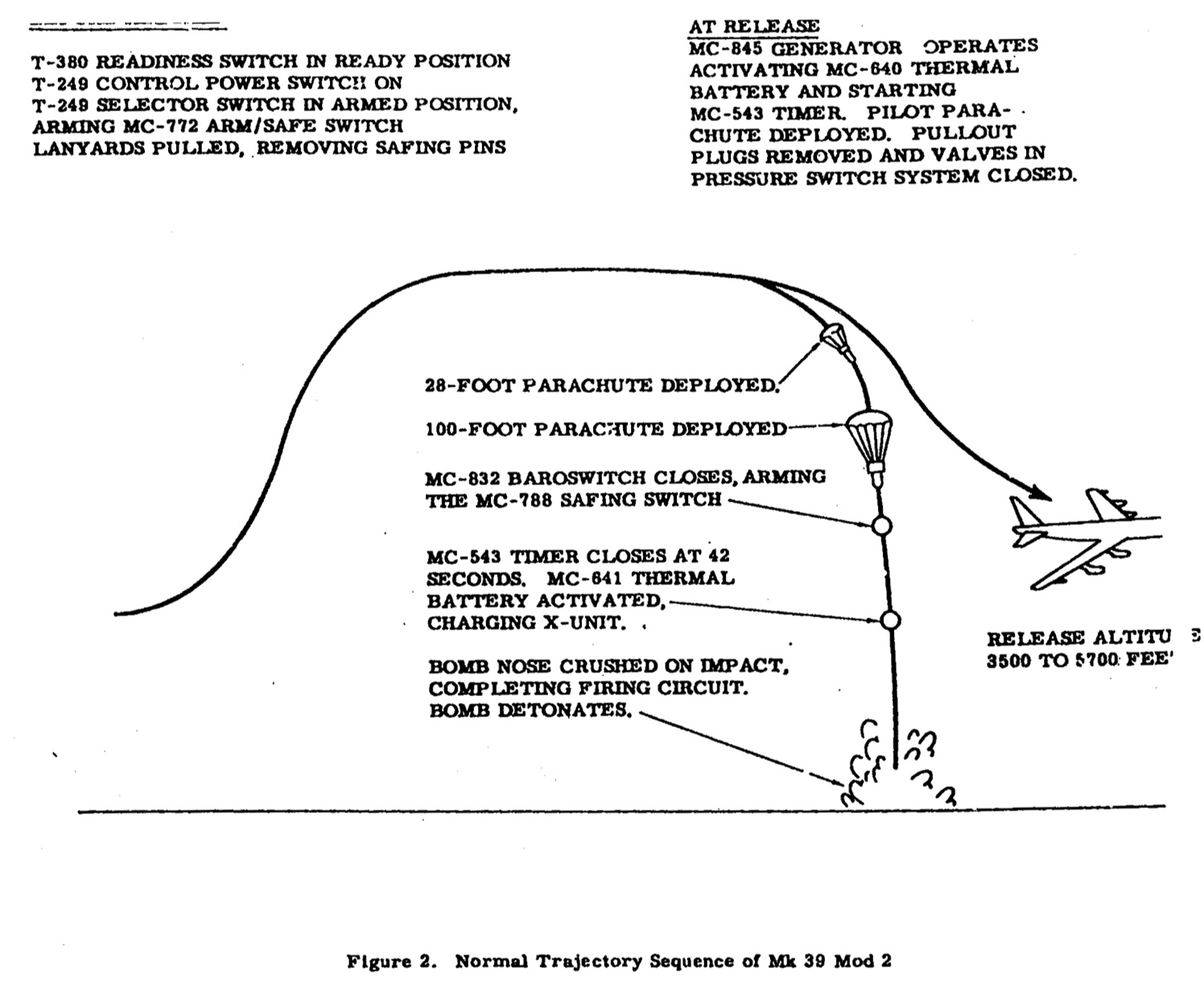
The "normal" sequence of fuzing for a Mark 39 Mod 2 bomb detonating as a contact burst.

The Mark 39 Mod 2 was initially pursued with the goal of providing the Mod 1 with a low-level (laydown) release capability, where the weapon would "detonate some time after the weapon struck the target and came to rest". Work was initially done on creating a new parachute system, and the weapon system was initially called to Mark 39 Mod 1 Big Tail. Difficulties arose that necessitated reworking the parachute arrangement as well as developing a different contact fuze (as the original piezoelectric crystals would not reliably operate at the relatively low impact speeds contemplated). A new tail system was developed for the weapon, and it became re-designated as the Improved Big Tail, or the Mark 39 Mod 2 bomb. The new tail used a two-stage parachute: first a 28-foot diameter chute, then a 100-foot diameter chute. Mark 39 Mod 1 weapons could be converted to Mark 39 Mod 2 weapons by changing their fuzing hardware and adding the large tail system. The Mark 39 Mod 2 fuzing system only permitted a contact burst.

The original Mark 39 Mod 2 used an MC-772 Arm/Safe switch to keep it from firing inadvertently should it be accidentally dropped from an aircraft at sufficient height and under the right circumstances to otherwise start its arming sequence. This would be engaged from the cockpit by the a T-380 Readiness Switch. In January 1960, a modification to the Mark 39 known as Alt 197 was approved which would replace the switch with the MC-1288 Arm/Safe switch, which would additionally prevent the weapon's low-voltage thermal batteries from charging if the Arm/Safe switch was in the "Safe" position, as an additional safety measure. The weapons involved in the 1961 Goldsboro B-52 crash a year later, did not have Alt 197 implemented. A consequence of the accident was that all Mark 39 Mod 2 weapons lacking Alt 197 were "red-lined" and removed from deployment until the change could be enacted. In the 1961 Yuba City B-52 crash a few weeks later, the Mark 39 Mod 2 bombs involved did have Alt 197 applied to them, but the low-voltage thermal batteries were nonetheless activated in one of the weapons despite the MC-1288 Arm/Safe switch being in the "Safe" position. According to the Defense Atomic Support Agency, "post-mortem analysis indicates a probable cause of the activation of the low voltage thermal batteries of the one weapon was a cable short which permitted the energy from the MC-845 Bisch Generator to bypass the MC-1288 Arm/Safe Switch. It is suspected that the MC-845 pulse resulted from the mechanical shock sustained upon impact and was passed to the MC-640 [thermal batteries] through one of the possible random short circuits."

== Accidents ==
The Mark 39 bomb is known to have been involved in at least four serious "Broken Arrow" nuclear accidents between 1958 and 1961.

=== Dyess AFB, November 1958 ===
On November 4, 1958, a B-47 with a Mark 39 Mod 1 (sealed pit) weapon on board crashed and exploded shortly after takeoff (for a training mission) from Dyess Air Force Base, near Abilene, Texas. The high-explosives in the weapon's primary detonated, dispersing depleted uranium, highly enriched uranium, and lead. The detonation created a crater 6 feet (1.8 m) deep and 35 feet (11 m) in diameter.

=== Barksdale AFB, July 1959 ===
On July 6, 1959, a C-124 crashed on takeoff from Barksdale Air Force Base in Louisiana, with three Mark 39 Mod 2 weapons aboard. One weapon was completely destroyed by the fire, the other two were disassembled and salvaged. There was no detonation of high explosives in any of the weapons. According to one report, "One bomb completely except for the squash [thermonuclear secondary]... parachutes of other weapons were partially burned."

=== Goldsboro, NC, January 1961 ===
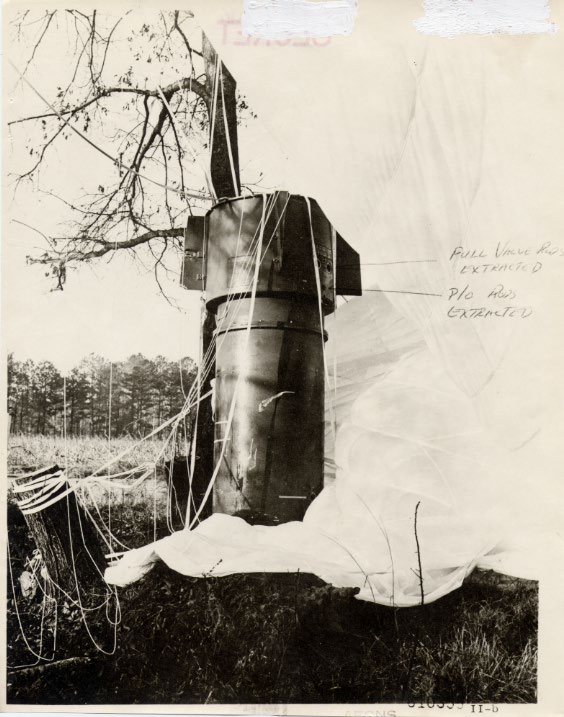
Weapon No. 1, a Mark 39 Mod 2 thermonuclear weapon, as found by the explosive ordnance disposal team after the 1961 Goldsboro B-52 crash.

On January 24, 1961, two Mark 39 Mod 2 nuclear bombs were being carried by a B-52 Stratofortress when it broke up in the air and crashed near Goldsboro, North Carolina. The bombs were flung from the aircraft in such a way that initiated their firing sequences. One bomb left the plane at a high-enough altitude, and with a functioning parachute, allowing the firing sequence to go through every stage up to the Arm/Safe Switch, which functioned as intended and prevented a full detonation. The other left the plane at a lower altitude, and its parachute failed to open, and its firing sequence failed to prepare the bomb to arm even prior to the Arm/Safe Switch, and the weapon broke up upon contact with the ground prior to its fuzing system being armed. When its Arm/Safe Switch was recovered, it indicated visually that it was in the "Arm" position. However, further inspection found that this was only superficial (it was not actually electrically "armed"), and related to damage the switch sustained upon impact. The thermonuclear "secondary" of the second weapon was never recovered. The high-explosives in neither bomb detonated. The Goldsboro crash is considered by many, including safety engineers at Sandia National Laboratories, to be one of the "closest" calls for an accidental nuclear detonation, as the Arm/Safe Switch in the Mark 39 was known to be capable of accidental engagement.

=== Yuba City, CA, March 1961 ===
On March 14, 1961 a B-52 carrying two Mark 39 Mod 2 (Alt 197) weapons crashed 15 miles (24 km) west of Yuba City, California. One of the weapons was relatively intact. The other had separated from the aircraft after impact, tumbled several times, and had its internal components ("the primary and most of its secondary") thrown out of its ballistic case. The high explosives did not detonate for either weapon. Despite having Alt 197 applied, which should have made it impossible for the low voltage thermal battery to charge without the MC-1288 Arm/Safe switch being set to the "ARM" position, the batteries were activated in one weapon. A post-mortem investigation suggested the probable cause was a cable short upon impact, which allowed the energy from the MC-845 Bisch generator to bypass the MC-1288 Arm/Safe switch.

== Museum casings ==
A Mark 39 Mod 2 casing is on display in the Cold War Gallery of the National Museum of the United States Air Force in Dayton, Ohio. The bomb was received from the National Atomic Museum at Kirtland Air Force Base, N.M., in 1993.

== See also ==
- List of nuclear weapons
