= 1961 Goldsboro B-52 crash =

Crash of US Air Force bomber with nuclear warheads

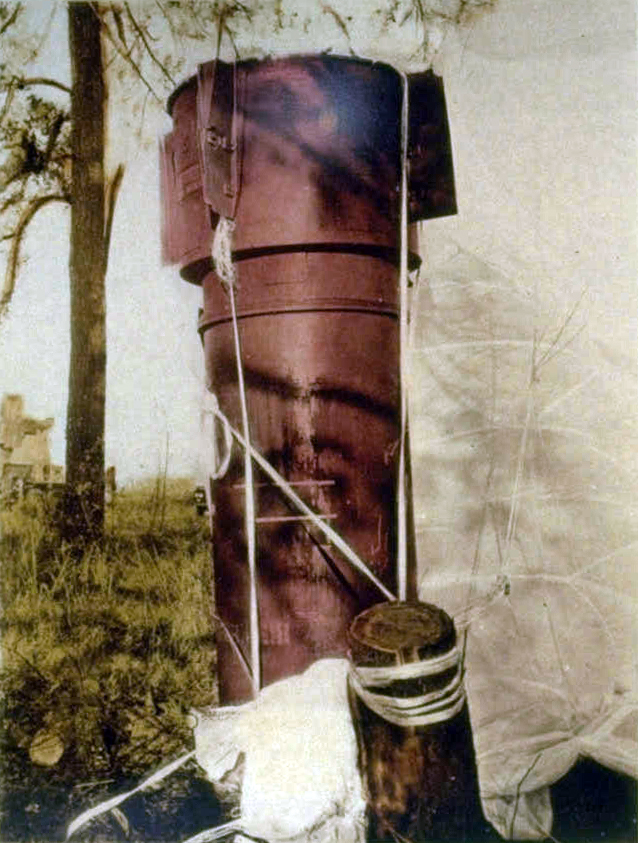
- One of the Mk 39 nuclear weapons at Goldsboro, largely intact, with its parachute still attached

Accident
- Date: 24 January 1961
- Summary: Structural failure
- Site: Faro, Nahunta Township, Wayne County, 12 mi (19 km) north of Goldsboro, North Carolina; 35°29′37″N 77°51′30″W

Aircraft
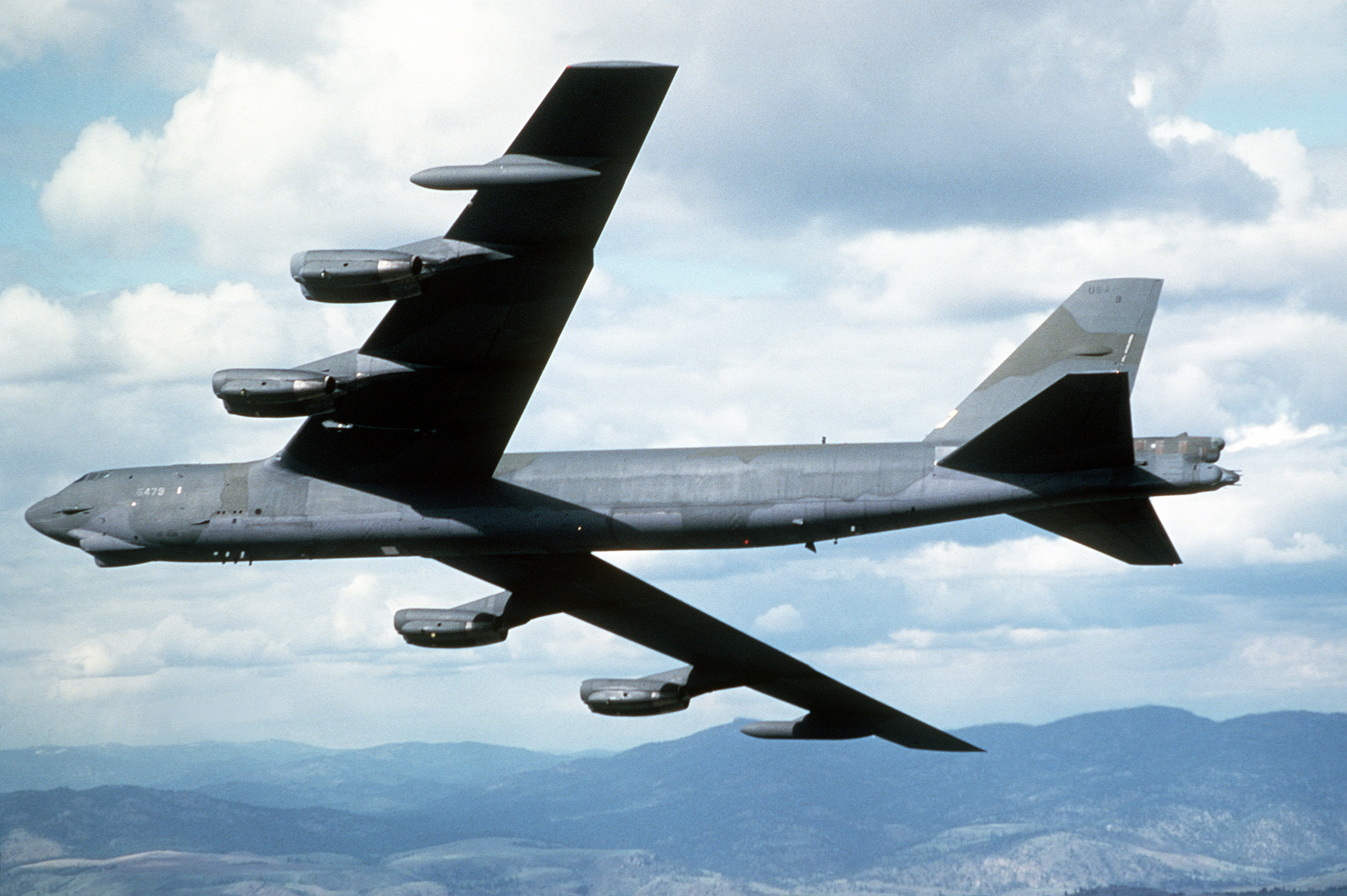
- A Boeing B-52 Stratofortress similar to the one involved
- Aircraft type: B-52G
- Operator: Strategic Air Command, United States Air Force
- Registration: 58-0187
- Flight origin: Seymour Johnson Air Force Base
- Destination: Seymour Johnson Air Force Base
- Crew: 8
- Fatalities: 3
- Survivors: 5

The 1961 Goldsboro B-52 crash was an aviation accident that occurred near Goldsboro, North Carolina, United States, on 24 January 1961. A Boeing B-52 Stratofortress carrying two 3.8-megaton Mark 39 nuclear bombs broke up in mid-air, dropping its nuclear payload in the process. Five crewmen successfully ejected or bailed out of the aircraft and landed safely; another ejected, but did not survive the landing, and two of them were killed in the crash.

The accident is one of the most famous "Broken Arrow" nuclear accidents of the Cold War. Both of the weapons began their firing sequences upon separation from the aircraft, despite safeguards meant to prevent that from occurring. One of its nuclear bombs was judged by nuclear weapons engineers at the time to have been only one safety switch away from detonation, and that it was "credible" to imagine conditions under which it could have detonated. The other bomb did not get as far into its firing sequence, but became deeply embedded in a muddy field, and one of its major weapons components (the thermonuclear "secondary" stage) was regarded as irrecoverably lost after an extensive, failed effort to recover it.

== Accident ==
North Carolina

The aircraft, a B-52G, was based at Seymour Johnson Air Force Base in Goldsboro, and part of the Strategic Air Command's airborne alert mission known as "Cover All" (a predecessor to Operation Chrome Dome), which involved a continuous flow of staggered, nuclear-armed bombers on a "ladder" route into the Canadian Arctic and back. (Note: An internal SAC history for 1961 noted that, "From a modest beginning in September 1958, with one bomb wing launching a combat ready B-52 every six hours, SAC's airborne alert indoctrination program had increased to 11 wings launching a total of 12 sorties per day by late 1962." The "Cover All" (as the internal SAC documents refer to it) operation doubled the previous number of sorties, bringing it up to 12 per day, flying on a "ladder" route "resembling giant north-south loops stretching from the US north into the Canadian Arctic", and began on 15 January 1961. Problems emerged in this arrangement, however, as simply adding more flights to the same route would make it crowded and "jeopardize flight safety," and if the flights climbed to 1/16th of the total force it would constitute a "safety hazard." As a result, a new "bomber stream airborne alert concept known as 'Chrome Dome'", which used two routes (one circumnavigating Canada, the other on a route from the Atlantic and Mediterranean), was developed. While it was pending approval, three other airborne alert "indoctrination training" operations were implemented after "Cover All" ended on 31 March 1961: "Clear Road" (1 April–30 June), "Keen Axe" (1 July–30 September), and "Wire Brush" (1 October–5 November). "Chrome Dome" began on 6 November.)

Around midnight on 23–24 January 1961, the bomber had a rendezvous with a tanker for aerial refueling. During the hook-up, the tanker crew advised the B-52 aircraft commander, Major Walter Scott Tulloch, that his B-52 had a fuel leak in the right wing. The refueling was aborted, and ground control was notified of the problem. The B-52 was directed to assume a holding pattern off the coast until the majority of fuel was consumed. However, when it reached its assigned position, the pilot reported that the leak had worsened and that 37,000 pounds (17,000 kg) of fuel had been lost in three minutes. The aircraft was immediately directed to return and land at Seymour Johnson Air Force Base.

As the aircraft descended through 10,000 feet (3,000 m) on its approach to the airfield, the pilots were no longer able to keep it in stable descent, and "lost all control as the B-52 went into a gyration best described as a spin." The pilot in command ordered the crew to abandon the aircraft, which they did at 9,000 feet (2,700 m). Five men landed safely after ejecting or bailing out through a hatch, one did not survive his parachute landing, and two died in the crash. The third pilot of the bomber, Lt. Adam Mattocks, is the only person known to have successfully bailed out of the top hatch of a B-52 without an ejection seat. The crew's final view of the aircraft was in an intact state with its payload of two Mark 39 thermonuclear bombs still on board, each with yields of 3.8 megatons. (Note: Following an early account of the accident by Ralph Lapp in 1962, many sources over the years the claim that the bombs at Goldsboro had yields of 24 megatons. This is now known to not be true. Lapp or his source may have gotten the weapons involved in the accident confused with the 23–25 megaton B41 nuclear bomb. (Lapp's account also incorrectly states there was a single bomb involved in the accident.) The exact weapon models involved in the accident were classified for many years, as were most details of the accident, leading to many seemingly contradictory accounts.) Sometime between the crew ejecting and the aircraft crashing, the two bombs separated from the aircraft.

The unmanned aircraft broke up in the air shortly after the crew ejected. Witnesses reported seeing two flashes of red light, suggesting that fuel explosions contributed to the breakup of the plane. At 12:35 a.m. EST on January 24, the remaining pieces of the B-52 impacted with the ground. The aircraft wreckage covered a two-square-mile (5.2 km^{2}) area of tobacco and cotton farmland at Faro, about 12 miles (19 km) north of Goldsboro. The arrangement of the aircraft pieces suggested that several pieces of the B-52 were upside down when they struck the ground.

Explosive ordnance disposal (EOD) teams from Seymour Johnson and other bases arrived on the scene quickly, disarming the one bomb that was easily accessible. Representatives from the Albuquerque Operations Office of the U.S. Atomic Energy Commission were alerted to the accident on the morning of January 24. A team of scientists and engineers from the AEC, Sandia National Laboratories, and Los Alamos National Laboratory assembled at Kirtland Air Force Base in New Mexico. They were joined by representatives from the Department of Defense Nuclear Safety Research Directorate. They flew to Seymour Johnson AFB on a C-47 cargo plane, arriving at approximately 10:15 p.m. EST on the night of January 24.

== Weapons ==
=== Mark 39 Mod 2 nuclear bombs ===
A basic diagram of a Teller-Ulam design thermonuclear weapon. Of note are the "primary" (labeled "A") and the "secondary" (labeled "B") subcomponents. The Mark 39 Mod 2 likely had a very similar basic arrangement, along with a firing set (X-Unit) for injecting gas into the core of the "primary" and detonating it.

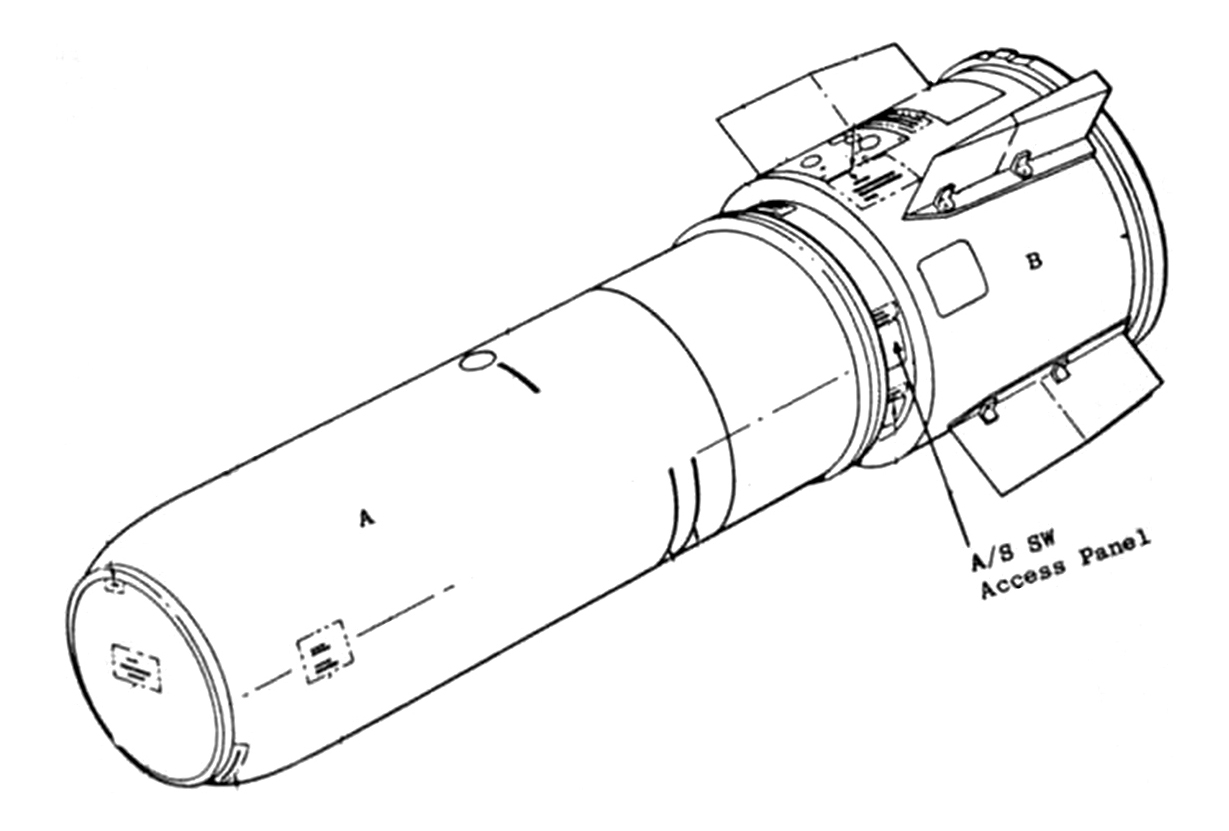
Diagram of the external features of a Mark 39 nuclear bomb, with the warhead compartment labeled as "A" and the parachute pack labeled as "B". The location of the access panel for the Arm/Safe Switch is indicated at the rear of the bomb, before the parachute pack. On the top of the parachute pack is the compartment from which the arming rods would be withdrawn. On the nose would be written: "REJECT IF DENTED OR DEFORMED".

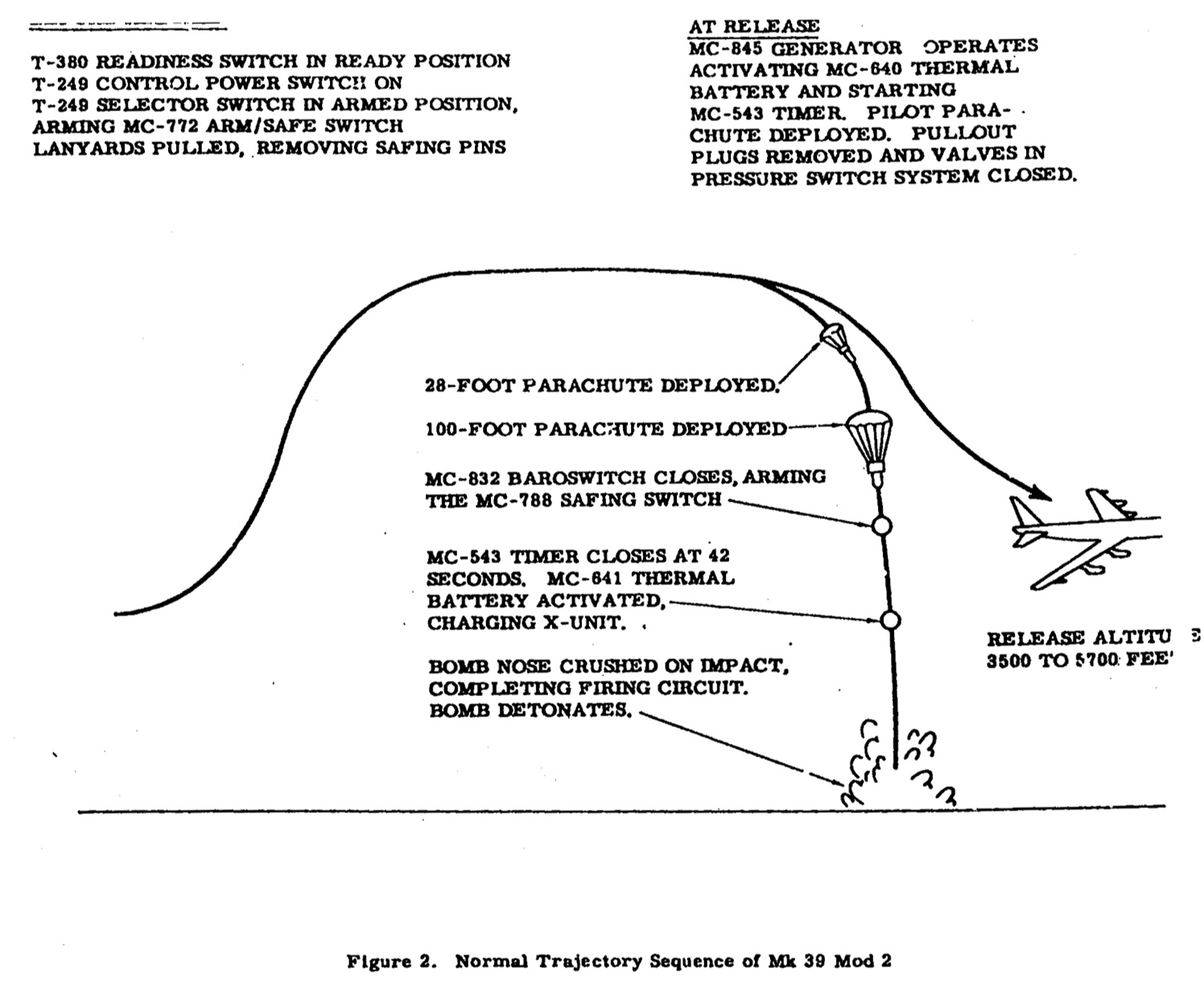
The "normal trajectory sequence" for the use of a Mark 39 Mod 2 nuclear bomb, indicating the arming sequence under normal (non-accident) nuclear weapons use conditions.

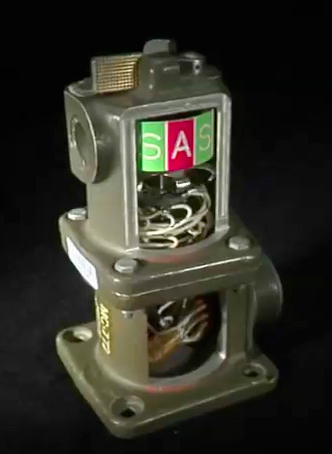
An image of the MC-772 Arm/Safe Switch of the same kind used in the Mk 39 Mod 2 nuclear bombs involved in the 1961 Goldsboro accident.

The two bombs involved in the Goldsboro accident were Mark 39 Mod 2 thermonuclear weapons with a maximum predicted yield of 3.8 megatons of TNT equivalent. It was a multi-stage thermonuclear weapon with a "primary" and a "secondary" stage. In such weapons, the "primary" is a mostly-fission driven stage whose energy is used to compress the "secondary," which initiates further fission reactions, nuclear fusion reactions, and the neutrons generated by the fusion stage can in turn generate more fission reactions.

In the case of the Mark 39 Mod 2, the "primary" was also boosted, meaning that at the moment of detonation a gaseous mix of deuterium and tritium was injected into its core, which would generate fusion reactions at the moment of detonation, producing neutrons that would increase the efficiency of the "primary". The pit of the primary was entirely composed of enriched uranium ("all-oralloy"), with no plutonium, and had a sealed-pit, meaning that it was fully-assembled at all times. (Note: By contrast, the Mark 39 Mod 0, a previous version of the same weapon, did not have a sealed pit. Its pit was kept outside of the primary, required being inserted using an "in-flight insertion" mechanism activated by the crew in order for the weapon to have any possibility of a nuclear yield.) The "secondary" also contained enriched uranium in its "sparkplug." The Mark 39 Mod 2 warhead was itself enclosed in a gravity bomb casing which had a compartment containing a drogue parachute that both allowed the aircraft dropping it to move to a safe distance, and allowed it to be detonated on the surface by a contact fuze without risk of the weapon breaking on contact with the ground. The weight of the assembled bomb was between 9,000 and 10,000 pounds (4,100 and 4,500 kg).

Immediately after the Goldsboro accident, technicians from Sandia National Laboratories, the national laboratory which had the primary responsibility of nuclear warhead safety engineering, subjected the recovered weapons to careful analysis to determine how close they were to a possible nuclear detonation. Various accounts of their conclusions have circulated over the years, with some emphasizing the closeness of the detonation, and some emphasizing the success of the various safety features of the nuclear warheads. To make sense of their analysis and the controversies, it is first necessary to understand what the normal firing sequence of a Mark 39 Mod 2 used in combat conditions would be.

The Mark 39 bombs would be suspended in the two bomb bays of the B-52 plane carrying them, one in front of the other. "Arming rods" were extended out of each weapon, and held in place with "safing pins." Prior to normal use, the "safing pins" would need to be pulled out of the bomb horizontally, which could be done by the crew in the cockpit by means of a lanyard that was connected to them. Additionally, prior to dropping the bomb, the pilot would need to operate a switch inside the cockpit (the T-380 Readiness Switch), which would enable the navigator to power-on and "arm" another switch (the T-249 Aircraft Monitor and Control Unit). The latter would operate the MC-772 Arm/Safe Switch inside the Mark 39 bomb itself. The Arm/Safe Switch was a low-voltage, solenoid-operated electro-mechanical switch that was kept in the "Safe" position until a deliberate choice was made to cause a nuclear detonation, but could be switched from "Safe" to "Arm" by a 28-volt electrical signal. The Mark 39 Mod 2 could only be detonated as a "contact" burst (and not an airburst). The bomb bay had a solenoid-operated lock system which would deploy the parachute automatically upon release if operated, as opposed to a free-fall release.

Once the bomb cleared the bomb bay and the arming rods were retracted, they would trigger the MC-845 Bisch generator they were connected to. This was a single-pulse generator that began the overall firing sequence. The Bisch generator would send an initiation signal to the MC-640 low-voltage thermal battery pack, as well as the MC-543 Timer. The timer would begin to count down. The retraction of the arming rods would also close valves sealing a reference chamber in the MC-832 Differential Pressure Switch, a barometric fuze for detecting the bomb's altitude.

After the weapon had fallen a required vertical distance, the differential pressure switch would close contacts which passed battery current through the MC-772 Arm/Safe Switch and from there to the MC-788 High Voltage Safing System, which is armed by continual current being applied to it. Upon receiving this current, the MC-788 would then connect the (not yet-charged) high-voltage thermal battery to the X-Unit, the electrical device that provides a high voltage signal to the detonators used in the "primary" stage of the weapon. (Note: The MC-788 High Voltage Safing System was a switch that "would prevent high voltage from reaching the X-unit so that if a fire or extreme heat ignited the high-voltage batteries, no harm would result." It was not, in other words, an independent Arm/Safe switch separate from the MC-772; the MC-722 would pass the 28-volt signal of the low-voltage batteries to the MC-788, which would close its connections and allow the high-voltage batteries to pass their 2,500-volt signal to the X-Unit. "When the bomb fell a distance to provide sufficient differential pressure to close the differential-pressure-switch contacts, the circuit was completed through the arming/safing switch [MC-722] to the energizing coils of the safing rotary switch [MC-788]. This latter switch then moved to the armed position, the ground was removed from the X-unit, and the circuit from the high-voltage thermal battery pack to the X-unit was completed." Another more general explanation of this system is in a later review of safety innovations at Sandia at this time: "Motor-driven safing switches incorporated into bombs, called 'ready-safe' switches, were operated by the pilot moving a control knob in the cockpit. Switches capable of holding off in excess of 2,500 volts were required for those systems... which had incorporated high voltage, thermally activated batteries. Systems which used low voltage power sources and some type of voltage step-up technique could use low voltage switches for the safing switch. Both high and low voltage safing switches had motor-driven contacts that would close when a 28-volt signal was applied.") After the timing circuit completed its countdown of 42 seconds, it would then deliver initiation power to the MC-641 High Voltage Thermal Battery pack. This would begin to generate its full voltage of 2,500 volts within one to two seconds, which would be applied directly to the trigger circuit and, through the MC-788 High Voltage Safing System, to the capacitor bank of the X-Unit. Once the bomb impacted the ground, a crush switch on the nose of the bomb (the MC-787 Trigger Circuit) would be closed and trigger the X-Unit to discharge its capacitors and initiate the high-explosive system in the "primary" stage of the weapon.

At some point in the above sequence, not indicated in declassified documents (possibly because of its classified nature), "squibs" on the Los Alamos Laboratory 1A Valve Mechanism would fire and cause the gas from the boost reservoir to be injected into the "primary" of the bomb. (Note: The ordering of events in some of the documents seems to indicate that the triggering of the boost gas would have been done by a line which was enabled by the arming of the MC-722 Arm/Safe switch. For example, the table included in Speer's observer report, which is ordered to show "subsequent progress of the fusing/firing sequence," notes the status of the tritium reservoirs after the status of the Arm/Safe Switch, and before the status of the High Voltage Thermal Battery (triggered by the timer). Neither of the weapons at Goldsboro had their tritium reservoir "squibs" actuated, despite Weapon No. 1's timer having run down and successfully triggered its High Voltage Thermal Battery. This occasioned no obvious comment in the post-mortem accounts, suggesting this was as expected, which would be the case if the tritium reservoirs were only dischargeable if the Arm/Safe switch was set to "arm".)

By the time of the Goldsboro accident, the MC-772 Arm/Safe switch had been replaced in some Mark 39 Mod 2 units with another switch, the MC-1288 Arm/Safe switch, which also restricted the charging of the low-voltage thermal battery if the switch was in the "Safe" position. This was done to ensure additional safety for the weapons, and would remove the need for safing pins in the pullout rods. This modification (designated as Alt 197) had been approved in January 1960, but had not been performed on either of the bombs involved in the Goldsboro accident. (Note: In another B-52 crash a few weeks later, in Yuba City, California, the weapons involved did have Alt 197 applied to them, but the low-voltage thermal batteries were nonetheless activated in one of the weapons despite the MC-1288 Arm/Safe switches being in the "Safe" position. According to the Defense Atomic Support Agency, "post-mortem analysis indicates a probable cause of the activation of the low voltage thermal batteries of the one weapon was a cable short which permitted the energy from the MC-845 Bisch Generator to bypass the MC-1288 Arm/Safe Switch. It is suspected that the MC-845 pulse resulted from the mechanical shock sustained upon impact and was passed to the MC-640 [thermal batteries] through one of the possible random short circuits.")

For a parachute delivery, the Mark 39 would need to be released between 3,500 feet (1,100 m) and 5,700 feet (1,700 m) above the target. For a free-fall delivery, it would need to be released at least 35,000 feet (11,000 m) above the target, or else it would hit the ground prior to the timer circuit completing its countdown and the X-Unit being charged.

The two Mark 39 Mod 2 nuclear bombs involved in the Goldsboro crash had distinctly different outcomes. Official reports identified them as weapon no. 1 (or bomb no. 1) and weapon no. 2 (or bomb no. 2), with the first's parachute having deployed and the second having crashed into the ground in free-fall without any decrease in its speed. Weapon no. 2 was kept in the forward bomb bay of the aircraft, while weapon no. 1 was in the aft bomb bay.

=== Weapon No. 1: Serial No. 434909 (parachute) ===
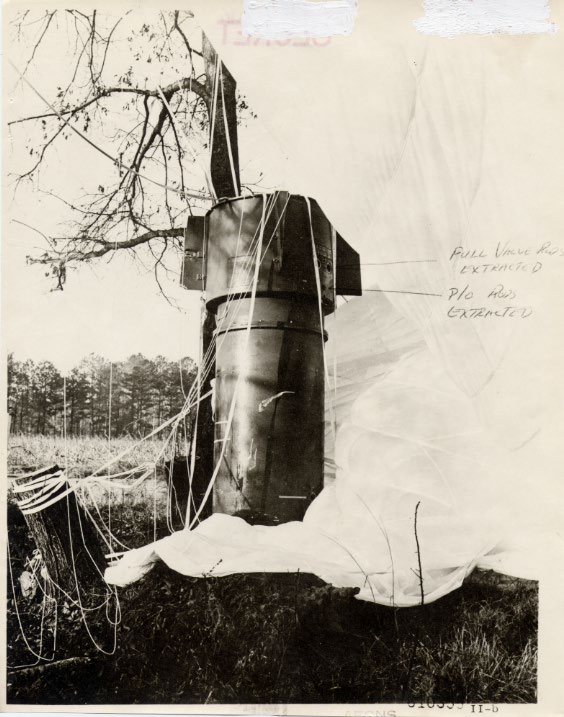
Weapon No. 1 as it was discovered by the EOD team after the accident.

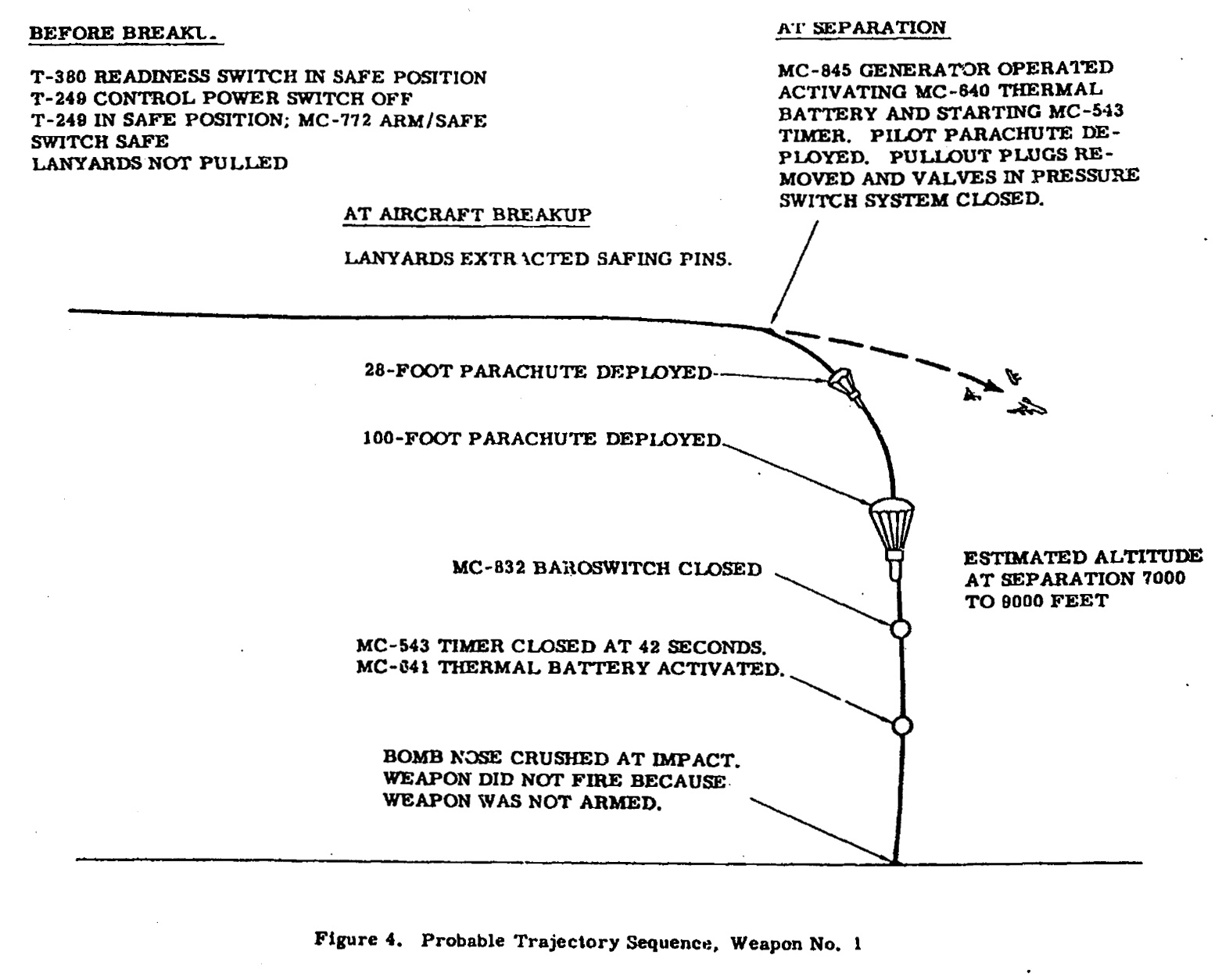
The "probable trajectory sequence" of Weapon No. 1 in the Goldsboro Accident.

Weapon no. 1, identified as serial number 434909 (and kept in the aft bomb bay), was flung out of the aircraft at an altitude of around 9,000 feet (2,700 m) above the ground. It apparently twisted from its rack in a way that caused the "safing pins" on its arming rods to pull out longitudinally and without any sign of damage, despite not having been pulled from the crew compartment. Once it left its rack, the bomb dropped in such a way that its arming rods were pulled out in much the same manner as an intentional drop sequence would be. This caused its MC-845 Bisch generator to be actuated, initiating the MC-640 low-voltage thermal battery pack and the MC-543 timer. The explosive actuators triggered the deployment of the bomb's parachute as in normal functioning.

The MC-832 Differential Pressure Switch operated as normal, and passed the battery current to the MC-772 Arm/Safe switch. This switch was found by the initial explosive ordnance disposal (EOD) team on the scene to be in the "Safe" position, and did not pass its current on further. The MC-543 safe-separation timer ran its full length (42 seconds), and initiated the MC-641 High-Voltage Thermal Battery Pack. Upon impact with the ground, the crush-switch closed, which would under normal circumstances fire the weapon. But as the MC-772 Arm/Safe Switch had not activated the MC-788 High-Voltage Safing Switch, the X-Unit was not charged, and no detonation occurred. The "squibs" that would inject the boost gas into the weapon were not released and the tritium reservoir was found intact.

The bomb was found in an upright position, with its parachute hanging on adjacent trees, about one mile (1.6 km) behind where the main wreckage of the aircraft crashed. On January 24, the EOD team from Wright-Patterson Air Force Base disassembled and "safed" the weapon (by disconnecting the tritium reservoir from the primary), and returned it to Seymour Johnson AFB. The weapon was described as having only sustained "negligible damage", with only a broken nose plate, and its nose buried about 18 inches (460 mm) in the soil. Approximately one pint (half a liter) of JP-4 jet fuel was found in the bomb case.

There have been differing interpretations offered as to how close this particular weapon was to having a nuclear detonation. An initial report by Sandia in February 1961 concluded that weapon no. 1 "underwent a normal release sequence in which the parachute opened and the components of the weapon which were given an opportunity to actuate by the pulling of the Bisch rods did behave in the manner expected. Full operation of this weapon was prevented by the MC-772 Arm/Safe Switch, the primary safing device." Other measures meant to provide additional safing, such as the "safing pins," failed.

Parker F. Jones, a supervisor at Sandia, concluded in a reassessment of the accident in 1969 that "one simple, dynamo-technology, low voltage switch stood between the United States and a major catastrophe." He further suggested that it would be "credible" to imagine that in the process of such an accident, an electrical short could cause the Arm/Safe Switch to switch into the "Arm" mode, which, had it happened during the Goldsboro accident, could have resulted in a multi-megaton detonation. A Sandia study on the US nuclear weapons safety program by R.N. Brodie written in 1987 noted that the ready/safe switches of the sort used in this era of weapon design, which required only a 28-volt direct current to operate, had been observed many times to inadvertently be set to "arm" when a stray current was applied to the system. "Since any 28-volt DC source could cause the motor to run, how could one argue that in severe environments 28 volts DC would never be applied to that wire, which might be tens of feet long?" He concluded that "if [weapon no. 1] in the Goldsboro accident had experienced inadvertent operation of its ready-safe switch prior to breakup of the aircraft, a nuclear detonation would have resulted."

Bill Stevens, a nuclear weapon safety engineer at Sandia, gave the following assessment in an internal documentary film produced by Sandia in 2010: "Some people can say, 'hey, the bomb worked exactly like designed.' Others can say, 'all but one switch operated, and that one switch prevented the nuclear detonation.'" Charlie Burks, another nuclear weapons systems engineer for Sandia, also added: "Unfortunately, there have been thirty-some incidents where the ready/safe switch was operated inadvertently. We're fortunate that the weapons involved at Goldsboro were not suffering from that same malady."

=== Weapon No. 2: Serial No. 359943 (free-fall) ===
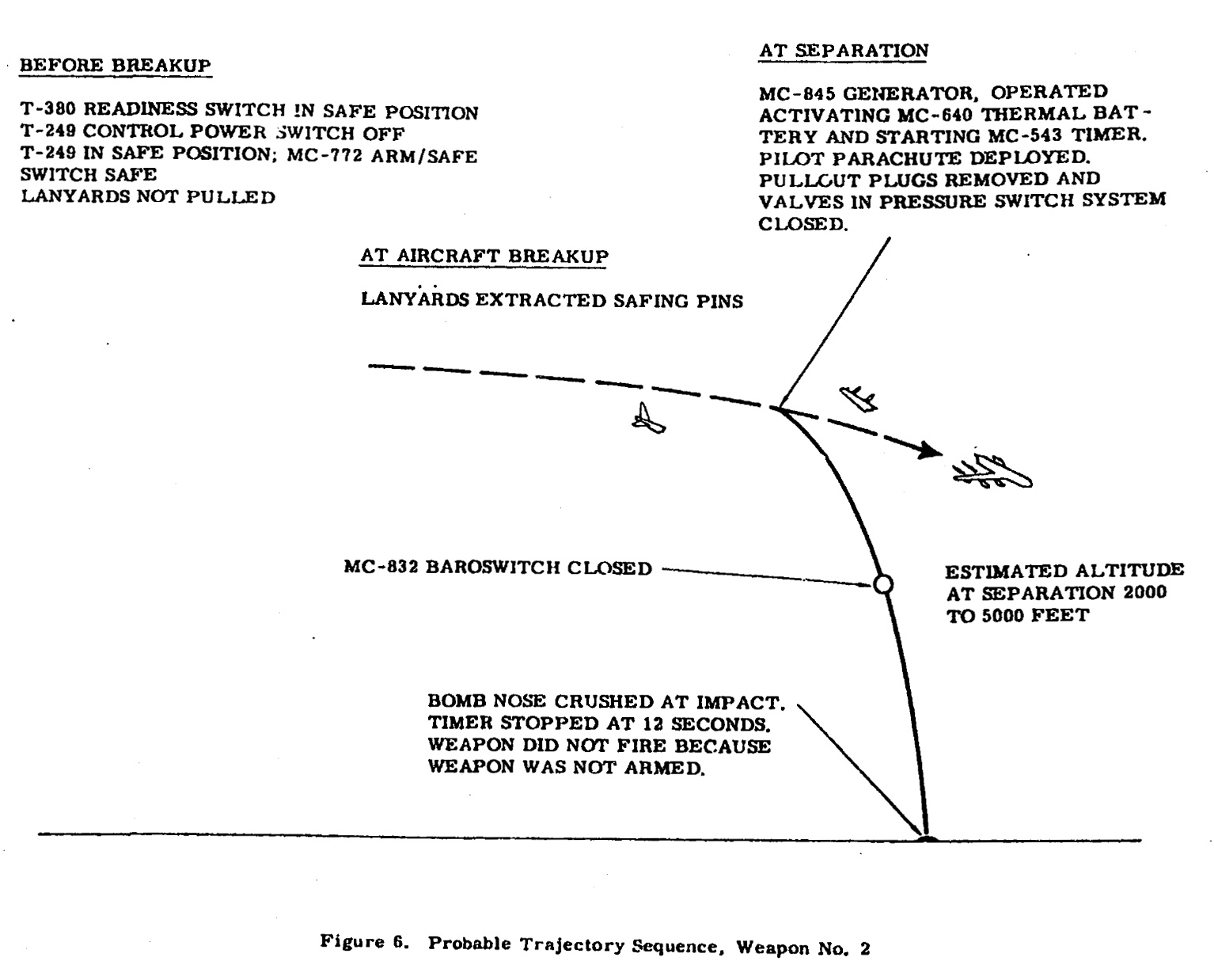
The "probable trajectory sequence" of Weapon No. 2 in the Goldsboro Accident.

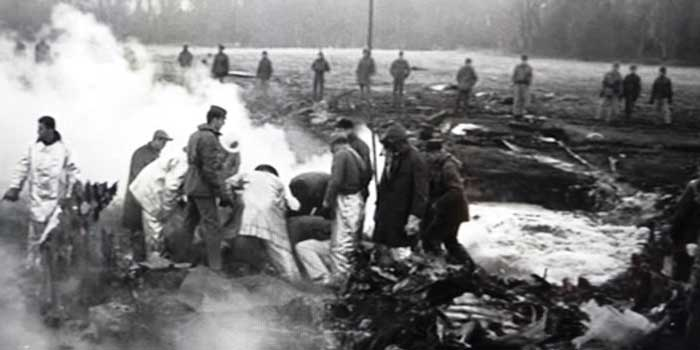
EOD personnel work to recover the buried Mk. 39 thermonuclear bomb that fell into a Faro, North Carolina, field in 1961.

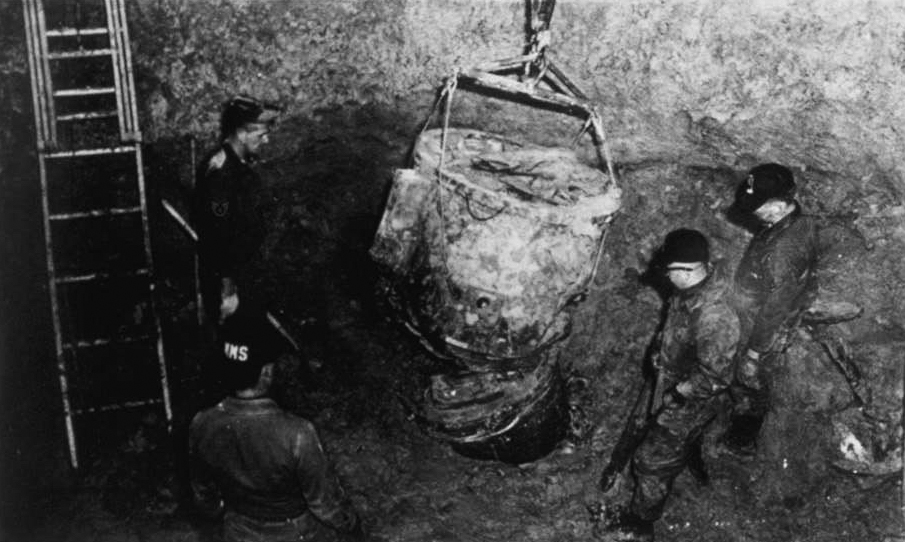
Air Force personnel working in an underground pit to recover parts of the MK-39 nuclear bomb

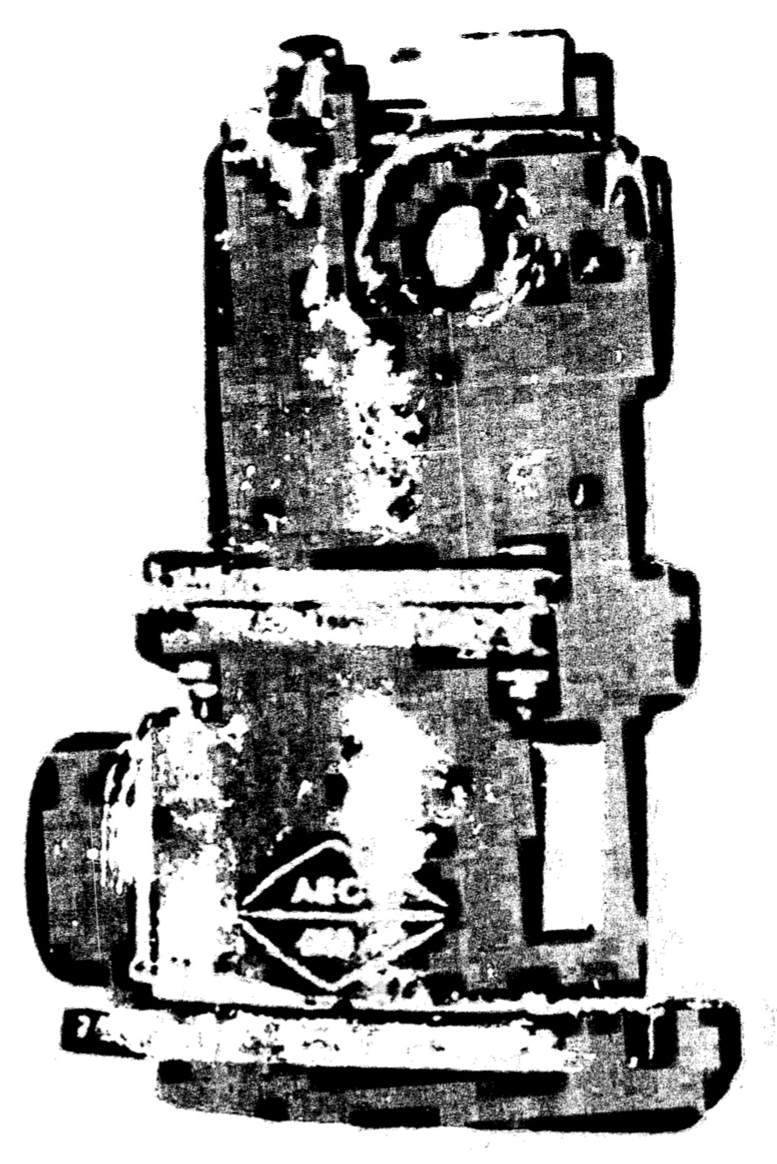
The battered MC-722 Arm/Safe Switch from Weapon No. 2 in the Goldsboro B-52 accident, 1961.

Weapon no. 2 (kept in the forward bomb bay) separated from the B-52 later than weapon no. 1, when it was between 5,000 feet (1,500 m) and 2,000 feet (610 m) above the ground. It was discovered about 500 yards (460 m) away from the crew compartment and wing sections of the aircraft wreckage, along the line of flight. As with weapon no. 1, its "safing pins" were pulled, allowing its arming rods to withdraw. As before, this initiated the MC-845 Bisch generator, which activated the low-voltage thermal batteries and started the MC-543 Timer. However, because the weapon had been released at such a low altitude, and its parachute had failed to open, it collided with the ground at high speed. Its timer circuit had run only 12 to 15 seconds when it impacted, and consequently, the high-voltage thermal battery did not activate. For unknown reasons, its parachute did not deploy, despite the parachute deployment mechanism having been activated. As the impact of the weapon had resulted in a crater of significant size – five feet (1.5 m) deep and nine feet (2.7 m) in diameter – it was initially assumed that the high-explosives in the weapon's "primary" stage had detonated. However, it was later confirmed that there had not been any HE detonation of this or the other weapon, and there had been no contamination of the site with fissile material.

The EOD team found that the bomb had apparently left the airplane still attached to its rack, and that its timer circuit could not start until it had left its rack. (The rack was found a mile east of the bomb itself.) The bomb had become deeply buried in mud, and it required three days of excavation to recover its MC-772 Arm/Safe Switch. In 2013, Lt. Jack ReVelle, an EOD officer on the scene, recalled the moment: "Until my death I will never forget hearing my sergeant say, 'Lieutenant, we found the arm/safe switch.' And I said, 'Great.' He said, 'Not great. It's on arm.'" Another EOD officer recalled: "The arm safety switch was on, armed and functioning."

A representative of the Atomic Energy Commission noted that after the discovery of the Arm/Safe Switch in the "Armed" position, and the arming rods having been pulled out, he and his colleagues "wondered why bomb No. 2 had been a dud." An immediate analysis showed that the Arm/Safe Switch was "electrically... neither in armed nor safe position." The switch and other components were shipped to Sandia for further "post-mortem" analysis, and it was determined that while the switch's indicator drum had rotated to the "Arm" position, it had disconnected from its contacts, and was never electrically "armed." They concluded that this was damage caused by the impact shock of the bomb hitting the ground, which also damaged the switch to such an extent that the circuit could not have closed even if it were in the "Arm" position.

As with weapon no. 1, the tritium reservoir in weapon no. 2 was recovered intact and without any loss of tritium. The MC-788 High Voltage Safety Switch was destroyed on impact.

Weapon no. 2 had broken into pieces on its impact, and the EOD technicians spent several days attempting to recover its pieces from the deep mud. The "primary" of the weapon was recovered on January 30, six days after the accident, at a depth of some 20 feet (6.1 m) in the mud. Its high-explosives had not detonated, and some had crumbled out of the warhead sphere. By February 16, the excavation had gotten down to 70 feet (21 m), and had not located the "secondary" component of the weapon.

Excavation of the second bomb was complicated by the freezing cold, a high water table, and the extreme muddiness. Pumps were used to remove water, and the sides of the crater were reinforced with plywood, but it was decided after digging down to 42 feet (13 m) to abandon the effort. The fusion "secondary" of the second weapon was never recovered. The University of North Carolina at Chapel Hill subsequently determined the buried depth of the secondary component to be 180 ± 10 feet (55 ± 3 m).

An analysis by Sandia in February 1961 concluded that:

Weapon No. 2, which underwent something other than normal release from the aircraft, evidenced by the fact that the parachute did not deploy, also had its arming rods extracted, and those components which were given the opportunity to act, did act in the manner expected. Full operation of this weapon was prevented by several things:

1. Impact occurred so soon after separation of the Bisch rods that the timers were not given an opportunity to run down.
2. The Arm/Safe Switch was in the "Safe" condition as the weapon left the aircraft.

Another analysis by Sandia engineers in 1961 concluded that while in both weapons the MC-772 Arm/Safe Switch operated "as it was designed to do," the lanyard-controlled safing-pins "cannot be relied upon to prevent initiation of the fuzing sequence" in this kind of accident, and recommended implementing a modification to the weapons "as rapidly as possible" that would prevent the fuze power supply from activating except when live release was intended.

A 1969 analysis by Sandia supervisor Parker F. Jones concluded that the Goldsboro accident illustrated that "the Mk 39 Mod 2 bomb did not possess adequate safety for the airborne alert role in the B-52."

=== Summary table ===
The "Official Observer's Report" of the accident summarized the condition of the two weapons' firing systems with the following table:

Table of Component Behavior, Fusing and Firing Systems
Part No.	Component	Bomb #434909 [No. 1]	Bomb #359943 [No. 2]
	Arming Wires [Arming/Pullout rods]	Pulled	Pulled
MC-845	Pulse Generator [Bisch generator]	Actuated	Actuated
MC-834	Explosive Actuator [started timer]	Fired	Fired
MC-543	Timer	Run down (42 sec.)	Run (12-15 sec.)
MC-832	Differential Pressure Switch [barometric altitude fuze]	All contacts closed	2 contacts closed
MC-640	Low Voltage Thermal Battery	Actuated	Actuated
MC-772	Arm-Safe Switch	Safe	Safe [but appeared armed upon visual inspection]
1-A (Note: Another document lists the "Reservoir type" of the weapons involved in this accident as "2A-12" and "2A-22755".)	Tritium Reservoir	Full [i.e. unfired]	Full [i.e. unfired]
MC-641	High Voltage Thermal Battery	Actuated	Not actuated
MC-788	Rotary Safing Switch [High-Voltage Safing System]	Not operated	Destroyed
MC-730	X-Unit [Primary firing set]	Not charged	Not charged
MC-616	Nose crystals [Contact fuze]	Crushed	Crushed

To summarize the Sandia post-mortem described in detail above, for Bomb No. 1, had the Arm-Safe Switch been set to "Arm," or malfunctioned in a way that enabled the firing circuit to act as if it was armed, the bomb would have detonated with a full nuclear yield upon the contact fuze closing when it hit the ground. For Bomb No. 2, because its timer had not run out by the time it struck the ground, it could not have detonated even if its Arm-Safe Switch had been set to "Arm", as its thermal batteries had not charged, and they would be needed to fire the weapon.

== Legacy ==
The Goldsboro accident was reported in national and international newspapers by the next day, described as a plane crash with "two unarmed nuclear weapons" which, at time of reporting, posed "no immediate danger" from a nuclear detonation, but that "a danger from non-nuclear high explosives" required all people to keep the site clear. An article in Time in March further specified that the weapons involved were "H-bombs." This news coverage caused a SAC representative to be asked about the accident, and other accidents from 1959 onward, at a hearing of the United States Congress that March, which were officially and publicly disclosed for likely the first time. Despite this, an official SAC history from 1988 reported, erroneously, that "until 1966, the history of SAC's alert operation had been without incident." Political scientist Scott Sagan has used this as an example of "what appears to be the complete disappearance of a number of B-52 airborne alert accidents from the command's organizational memory" and indicative of "the depth of SAC's reluctance to acknowledge such problems."

Secretary of Defense Robert S. McNamara, in a Top Secret January 1963 meeting with representatives from the Departments of Defense and State, as well as the White House, used the Goldsboro accident to argue against the delegation of authority to use nuclear weapons to SACEUR, citing the possibility of accidental nuclear war. According to declassified meeting notes, McNamara "went on to describe crashes of US aircraft, one in North Carolina and one in Texas (Note: McNamara's reference to a Texas "Broken Arrow" may refer to the November 4, 1958, an accident in which a B-47 with a Mark 39 Mod 1 (sealed pit) weapon on board crashed and exploded shortly after takeoff (for a training mission) from Dyess Air Force Base, near Abilene, Texas. The high-explosives in the weapon's primary detonated, dispersing depleted uranium, highly enriched uranium, and lead. The US Air Force has released no information about other "Broken Arrow" incidents with sealed-pit weapons taking place in Texas prior to 1963.), where, by the slightest margin of chance, literally the failure of two wires to cross, a nuclear explosion was averted. He concluded that despite our best efforts, the possibility of an accidental nuclear explosion still existed."

=== Consequences to Mark 39 bomb design ===
A safety modification to Mark 39 Mod 2 weapons known as Alt 197 had been approved in January 1960, but not yet applied to all deployed weapons prior to the Goldsboro accident, and was not applied to the weapons involved in the accident. Alt 197 replaced the MC-772 Arm/Safe switch with the MC-1288 Arm/Safe switch, with the main change being that the latter would prevent the charging of the low-voltage thermal battery when the Arm/Safe switch was in the "Safe" position, and as such would make sure that no electrical current was available anywhere within the bomb to power additional switches or hardware, legitimately or not. After the accident, all other Mark 39 Mod 2 weapons without the modification were taken off of deployment status ("red-lined") until the modification could be applied to the remaining inventory of the weapons.

=== Consequences to B-52 design ===
Wet wings with integral fuel tanks considerably increased the fuel capacity of B-52G and H models, but were found to be experiencing 60% more stress during flight than did the wings of older models. Wings and other areas susceptible to fatigue were modified in 1964 under Boeing engineering change proposal ECP 1050. This was followed by a fuselage skin and longeron replacement (ECP 1185) in 1966, and the B-52 Stability Augmentation and Flight Control program (ECP 1195) in 1967.

=== Easement ===
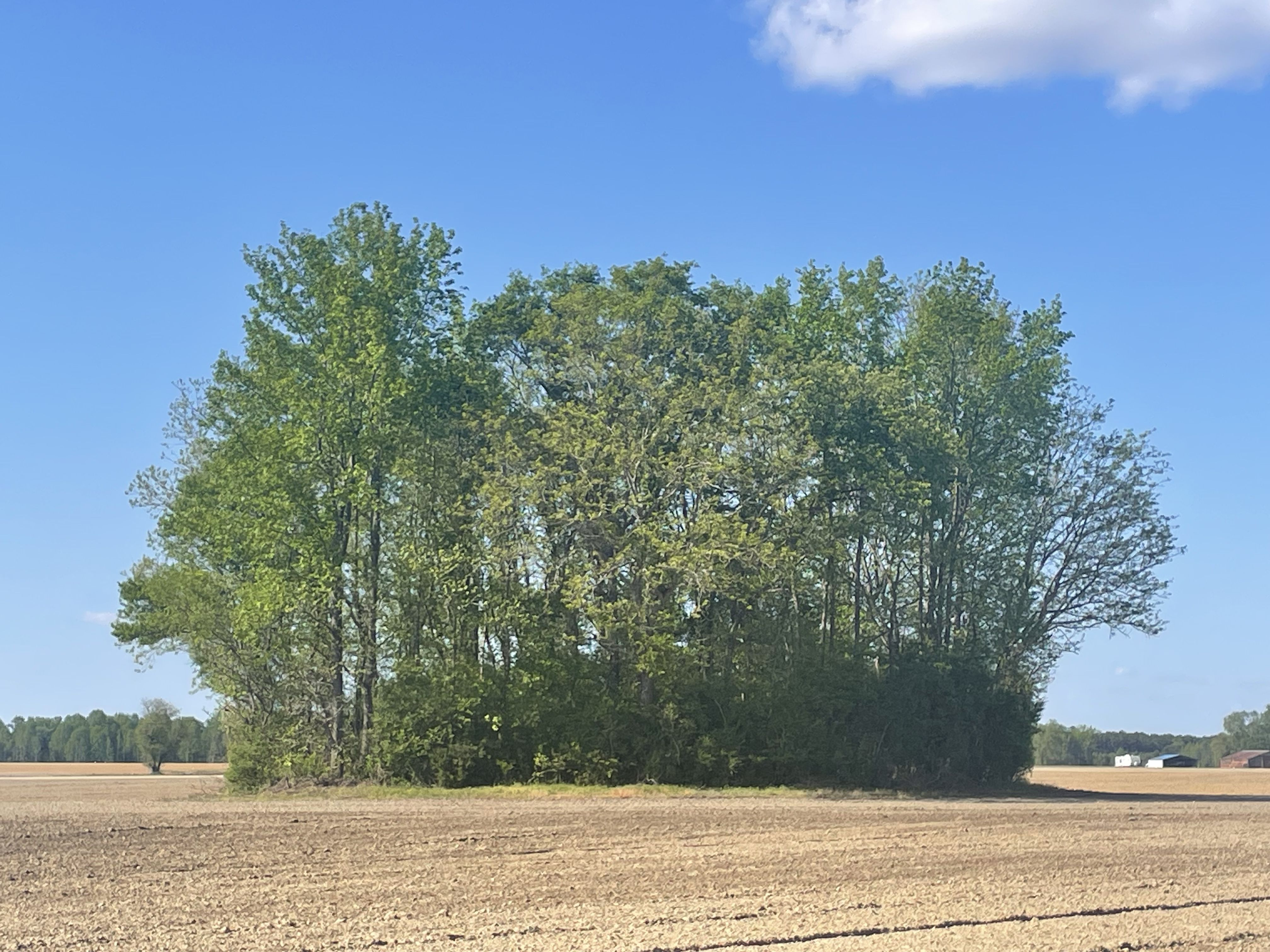
The farm field with the easement, including the nearby circular patch of trees in the middle of the farm field

In 1962, the landowner was paid $1,000 to grant the United States of America a perpetual 200-foot (61 m) radius circular easement over the remains of the buried second bomb. The site of the easement, at 35°29′37″N 77°51′30″W, is visible as a disturbed area, and lies approximately 250 feet (76 m) north of an obvious circle of trees (and disused cemetery) in the middle of a plowed field visible on Google Earth. The terms of the easement:

... convey unto the Grantee, the United States of America and its assigns, a perpetual and assignable easement for the establishment, maintenance and operation of a restricted area in, upon, over and across the land described herein, consisting of:

1. The right to prohibit said land from being used in any manner other than for the growing of crops, the growing of timber, or as pasture. Such permitted uses shall be subject to the following conditions:
  1. No drilling, digging, boring, excavating or other disturbances of the land will be permitted below a depth of five (5) feet.
  2. No structures of any kind whatsoever, except normal farm fencing, shall be constructed or erected upon said land.
2. The right to traverse said lands on foot for the purpose of making periodic inspections.
3. The right to cross other lands of the grantor on foot and by reasonable routes, to gain access to the easement area for the purpose of exercising the rights herein set forth.

=== Road marker ===
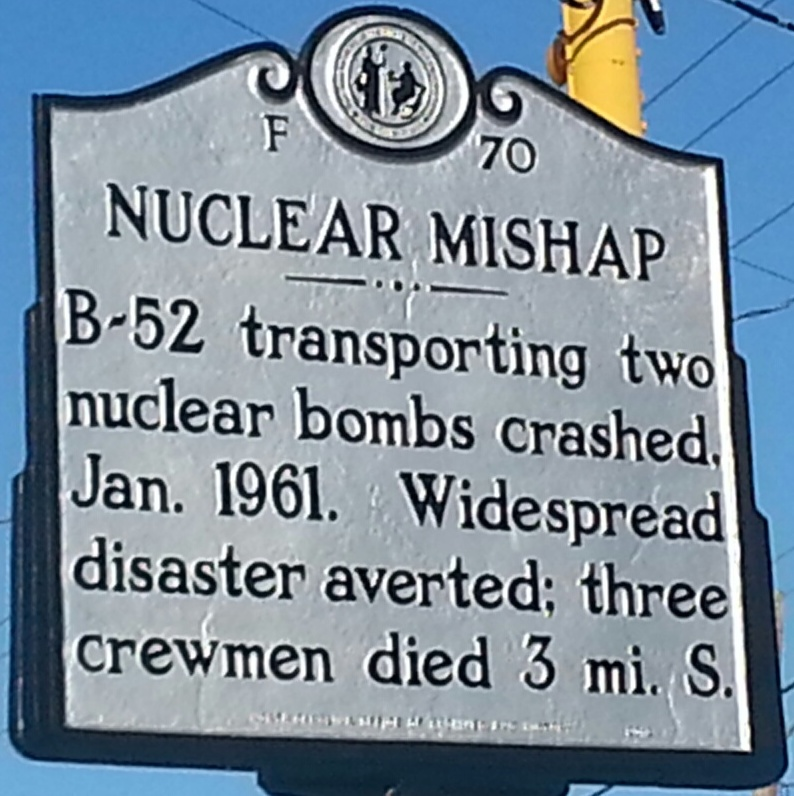
Road marker in Eureka, NC, commemorating the 1961 B-52 crash.

In July 2012, the State of North Carolina erected a historical road marker in the town of Eureka, 3 miles (4.8 km) North of the crash site, commemorating the crash under the title "Nuclear Mishap".

== See also ==
- 1961 Yuba City B-52 crash (another B-52/Mk 39 Mod 2 accident, weeks after Goldsboro)
- 1964 Savage Mountain B-52 crash (another B-52 nuclear crash, with a different bomb type)
- Special Weapons Emergency Separation System
- List of military nuclear accidents
- RAF Lakenheath nuclear weapons accidents – involved another US military nuclear accident 8 days before the Goldsboro crash
- United States military nuclear incident terminology § Broken Arrow

== General and cited references ==
- Bickelman, H.D. (February 1961). "Accident Report on B-52G Near Seymour Johnson Air Force Base North Carolina (SCDR 106-61)". Sandia Corporation (via the National Security Archive at George Washington University).
- Brodie, R. N. (February 1987). "A Review of the U.S. Nuclear Weapons Safety Program – 1945 to 1986 (SAND86-2955)" (PDF). Sandia National Laboratories.
- de Montmollin, J. M.; Hoagland, W. R. (February 1961). "Analysis of the Safety Aspects of the MK 39 MOD 2 Bombs Involved in B52G Crash Near Greensboro, North Carolina (SCDR 81-61)". Sandia Corporation (via the National Security Archive at George Washington University).
- Defense Atomic Support Agency (1 March 1966). "Accidents and Incidents Involving Nuclear Weapons (DASA Technical Letter 20-3)" (PDF). PBS.
- Department of Defense/Department of Energy (1996). "Narrative Summary of Accidents Involving U.S. Nuclear Weapons, 1950-1996" (PDF). U.S. Department of Energy (via Government Attic). (report begins on page 359 of the PDF)
- Jones, Parker F. (22 October 1969). "Goldsboro Revisited: Or How I Learned to Mistrust the H-Bomb: Or to Set the Record Straight". Sandia Corporation.
- Sandia National Laboratories (January 1968). "History of the MK 39 weapon (SC-M-67-671/RS 3434/20)".
- Sandia National Laboratories (2010). "Always/Never: The Quest for Safety, Control, and Survivability – Part 2". YouTube.
- Speer, Ross B. (28 February 1961). "Official Observer's Report, Air Force Accident, Goldsboro, North Carolina" (PDF). US Atomic Energy Commission (via Government Attic). (report begins on page 81 of the PDF)
- Atchison, David (2 July 2017). "Lincoln resident helped disarm hydrogen bomb following B-52 crash in North Carolina 56 years ago". The Anniston Star.
- Hanauer, Gary (April 1981). "The Pentagon's Broken Arrows". Mother Jones Magazine: 28.
- Hardy, Scott (2005). The Broken Arrow of Camelot: An Analysis of the 1961 B-52 Crash and Loss of the Nuclear Weapon in Faro, North Carolina (Thesis). East Carolina University.
- Knaack, Marcelle Size (1988). Post-World War II Bombers, 1945–1973 (PDF). Washington, DC: Office of Air Force History. ISBN 978-0160022609. Archived from the original (PDF) on 27 November 2011.
- Pilkington, Ed (20 September 2013). "US nearly detonated atomic bomb over North Carolina – secret document". The Guardian.
- Sedgwick, Jessica (January 2008). "Bombs Over Goldsboro". This Month in North Carolina History. Archived from the original on 28 December 2011.
- Sharon, Keith (27 December 2012). "When two nukes crashed, he got the call (Part 2 of 2)". Orange County Register (California). "Later, diggers found the ARM/SAFE switch. It was in the ARM position. Why that bomb didn't explode has been debated for years. Was the ARM/SAFE switch broken? Did the impact of the crash spread out the parts so far they couldn't affect each other? Was the bomb a dud? No one will ever know."
- Shaffer, Josh (2 July 2012). "Shaffer: In Eureka, They've Found a Way to Mark 'Nuclear Mishap.'". News and Observer. Archived from the original on 4 July 2012.
- Tuttle, Steve (27 March 2013). "A Close Call – Hero of 'The Goldsboro Broken Arrow' speaks at ECU". East Carolina University.
- Yancy, N. (26 January 1961). "Life-Death Story of Flight Told". Greensboro News & Record.
