= RAF Lakenheath nuclear weapons accidents =

Accidental damage to nuclear weapons, RAF Lakenheath, Suffolk, United Kingdom

1956 RAF Lakenheath B-47 crash
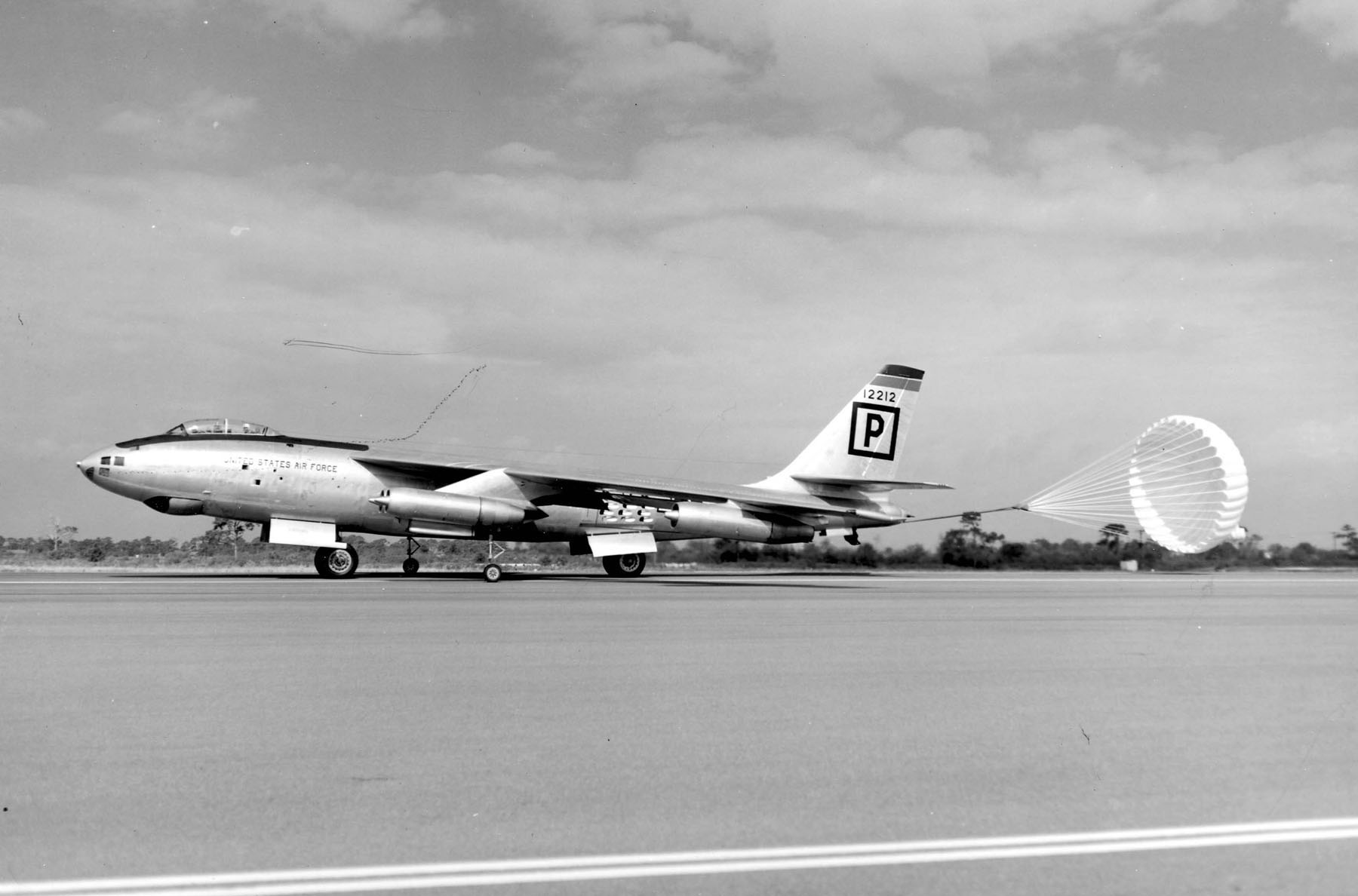
- A B-47 similar to the accident aircraft

Accident
- Date: 27 July 1956
- Summary: Runway excursion and crash upon landing, subsequent fire damage to nuclear weapons
- Site: RAF Lakenheath, Suffolk, United Kingdom

Aircraft
- Aircraft type: Boeing B-47 Stratojet
- Operator: 307th Bombardment Wing, United States Air Force (USAF)
- Flight origin: RAF Lakenheath
- Destination: RAF Lakenheath
- Occupants: 4
- Crew: 4
- Fatalities: 4
- Survivors: 0

1961 RAF Lakenheath Super Sabre fire
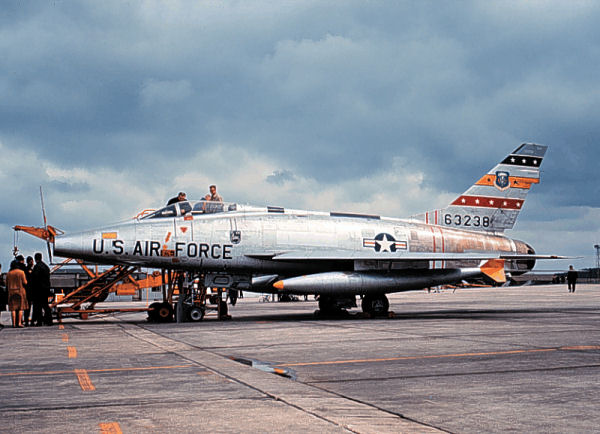
- A Super Sabre similar to the accident aircraft

Accident
- Date: January 16, 1961
- Summary: Fire on the ground caused by pilot error, subsequent damage to nuclear weapons
- Site: RAF Lakenheath, Suffolk, United Kingdom

Aircraft
- Aircraft type: North American F-100 Super Sabre
- Operator: United States Air Force (USAF)
- Flight origin: RAF Lakenheath
- Crew: 1
- Fatalities: 0
- Injuries: 0
- Survivors: 1

RAF Lakenheath in Suffolk, one of several air bases in the United Kingdom which was used by the United States Air Force to store nuclear weapons during the Cold War, was the site of accidents involving nuclear weapons, in 1956 and 1961.

== July 1956 incident ==
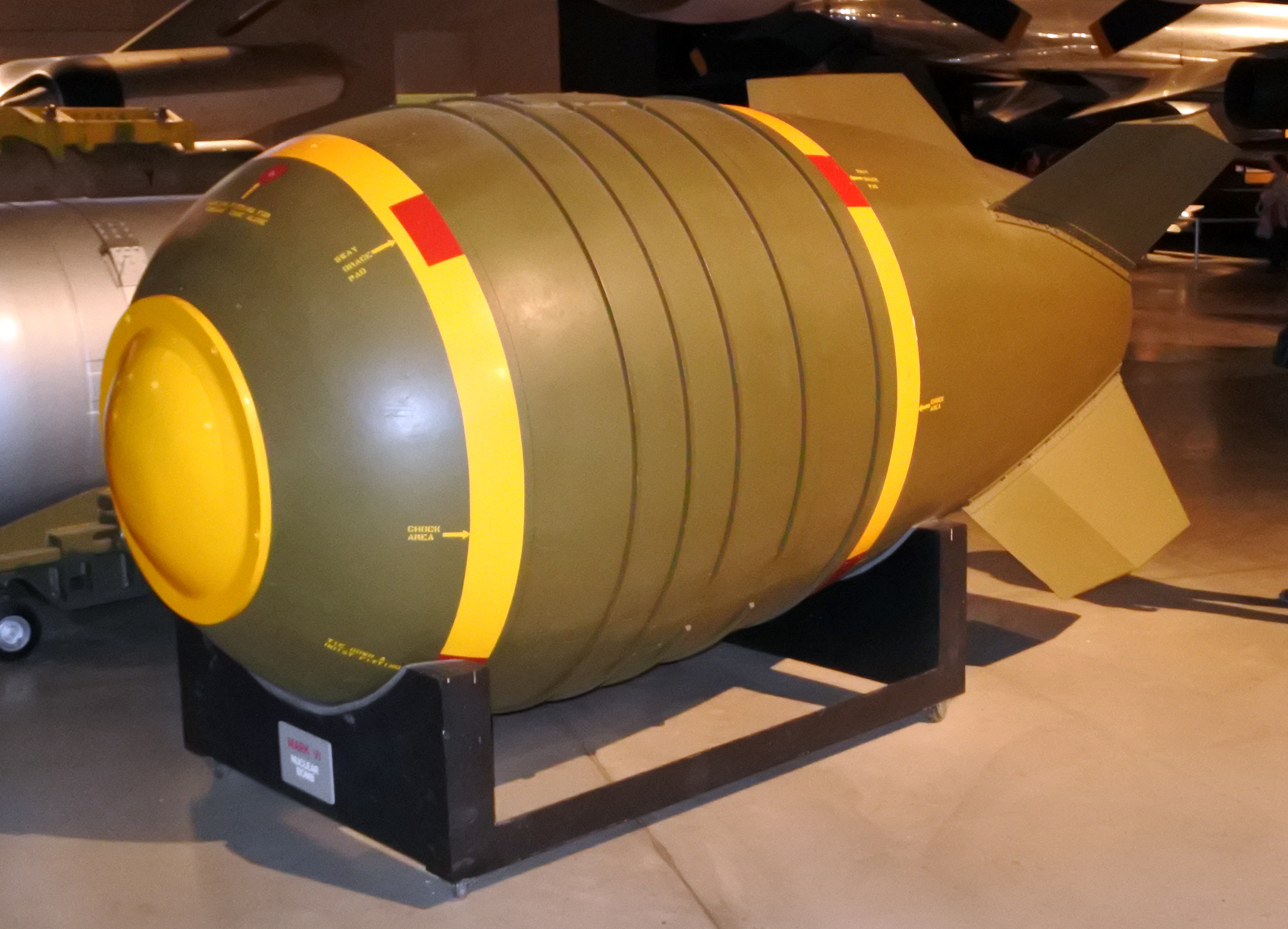
Mark VI nuclear bomb at the National Museum of the United States Air Force

The first of two recorded nuclear near-accidents at Lakenheath occurred on 27 July 1956, when a B-47 bomber belonging to the United States Air Force, while on a routine training mission, crashed into a storage igloo beside the runway containing three Mark-6 nuclear weapons. The igloo was ripped apart and the aircraft exploded, showering the stored bombs with burning aviation fuel. The bombs each had a yield ten times greater than the "Little Boy" atomic bomb dropped on the Japanese city of Hiroshima during the Second World War.

The crash and ensuing fire did not ignite the high explosives and no detonation occurred. However, one official US cable reported that it was a "miracle" that one bomb with "exposed detonators" did not explode, which would have released nuclear material into the environment. Had the conventional explosives in any of the bombs detonated, the resulting explosion would have scattered depleted uranium over a wide area. A senior US official was quoted as saying "it is possible that a part of Eastern England would have become a desert". Another USAF officer remarked "near disaster was averted by tremendous heroism, good fortune and the will of God".

Reports state that the incident caused mass panic at the base, remarking that there was "not just panic but a stampede out of Lakenheath". Emergency fire services travelling to the base to assist reportedly encountered "a convoy of American cars full up with American women and children" panicking and trying to get away, and USAF officers instructed taxi drivers to drive them anywhere away from Lakenheath.

The igloos at the airfield had been built near the runways to provide rapid availability for use. A different igloo at the airbase stored the nuclear cores of the bombs, and if the B-47 had hit that igloo instead, it could have released a large cloud of plutonium.

The damaged weapons and components involved in the incident were later returned to the Atomic Energy Commission. The B-47 involved in the accident, which killed four crewmen, was part of the 307th Bombardment Wing.

== January 1961 incident ==
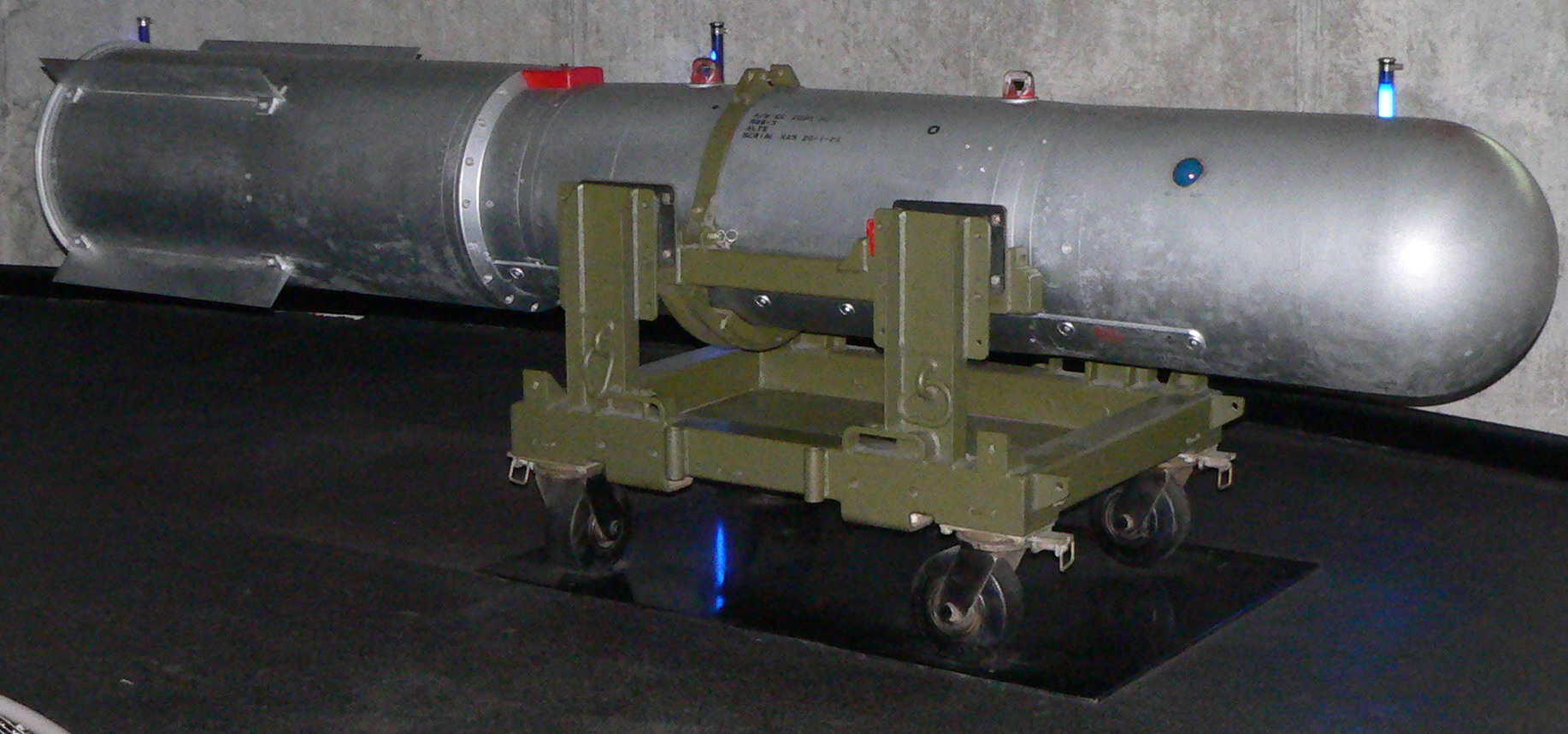
B28 bomb as used on a B52 bomber

A second nuclear near-disaster occurred at Lakenheath five years later in January 1961. A parked U.S. Air Force F-100 Super Sabre loaded with a Mark 28 hydrogen bomb caught fire after the pilot accidentally jettisoned his fuel tanks upon turning his engine on, the fuel tanks rupturing as they struck the concrete runway beneath. The aviation fuel inside ignited, and flames engulfed the nuclear bomb beneath the aircraft, leaving the nuclear weapon "scorched and blistered". The hydrogen bomb involved had a yield of at least 70 kilotons – 4.7 times more powerful than the 15 kiloton "Little Boy" atomic bomb dropped on Hiroshima in the Second World War.

== Legacy ==
The 1956 incident caused great concern for the British government, and they planned to block US authorities from ordering evacuations if a US nuclear weapons accident happened on British soil. This began a debate over how to block the US military from alerting the public in such an event, which might cause a national panic. The policy for the next few years was to completely deny any incident had occurred if the press got word of a nuclear accident. A similar nuclear near-disaster allegedly occurred at RAF Greenham Common less than two years after the first incident at Lakenheath in February 1958 when an aircraft possibly carrying a nuclear bomb caught fire, but the UK government officially denied an accident took place there as recently as 1996.

The USAF authorities, as well as the British and American governments, attempted to "hush up" reports on the 1956 incident at Lakenheath for some time. No official report on the accident was published by the UK government until a statement by the Secretary of State for Defence Francis Pym in November 1979, but the event was eventually acknowledged by the British government. However, the 1961 incident at the airfield was only officially acknowledged by the UK government in 2003, when the Ministry of Defence was forced to publish a list of 20 British accidents involving nuclear weapons between 1960 and 1991. This had come about as a result of a critical verdict from the Parliamentary Ombudsman.

RAF Lakenheath remains a U.S. Air Force base as of 2026.

== See also ==
- RAF Greenham Common nuclear near-accident – a nuclear near-accident that allegedly took place at a UK airfield in 1958.
- Windscale fire – a nuclear incident in the UK in 1957, involving a reactor used for creating nuclear materials to be used in nuclear weapons.
- 1961 Goldsboro B-52 crash – a nuclear near-disaster that occurred only eight days after the 1961 Lakenheath incident, on 24 January 1961.
- 1966 Palomares incident – a U.S. military nuclear near-disaster involving a B28 nuclear bomb.
