= Faro, North Carolina =

Unincorporated community in North Carolina, United States

Faro
- Unincorporated community
- Location within North Carolina Location within the United States
- Coordinates: 35°30′42″N 77°50′38″W
- Country: United States
- State: North Carolina
- County: Wayne
- Elevation: 121 ft (37 m)
- Time zone: UTC-5 (Eastern (EST))
  - Summer (DST): UTC-4 (EDT)
- Area codes: 919 & 984
- GNIS feature ID: 1010605

Faro is an unincorporated community in Wayne County, North Carolina, United States.

== 1961 Goldsboro B-52 crash ==
In Faro—12 miles (19 km) north of Seymour Johnson Air Force Base—two hydrogen bombs dropped during the 1961 Goldsboro B-52 crash as the aircraft broke up in flight. The crash site is 1.5 miles (2.4 km) southwest of Faro on Big Daddy's Road.

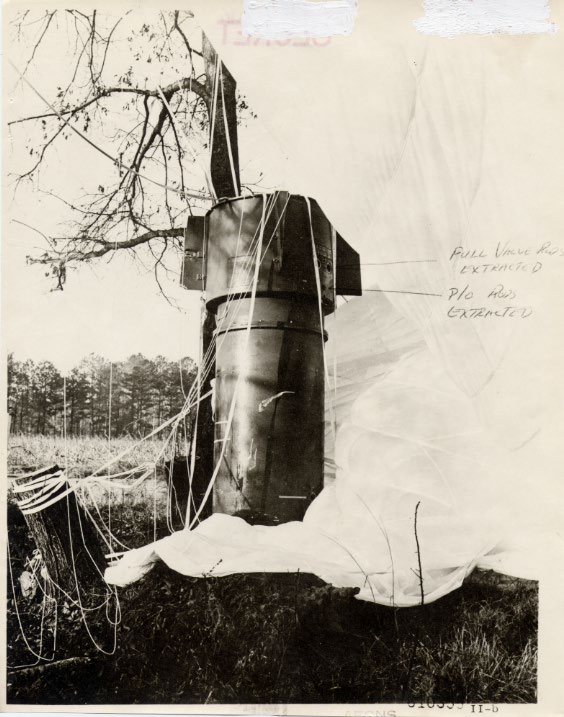
Thermonuclear bomb resting in a field in Faro

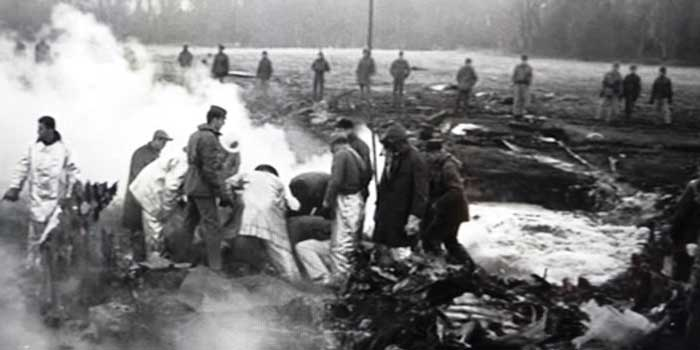
Explosive ordnance disposal personnel work to recover the buried thermonuclear bomb that fell into a field in Faro
