= Mark 15 nuclear bomb =

American thermonuclear bomb

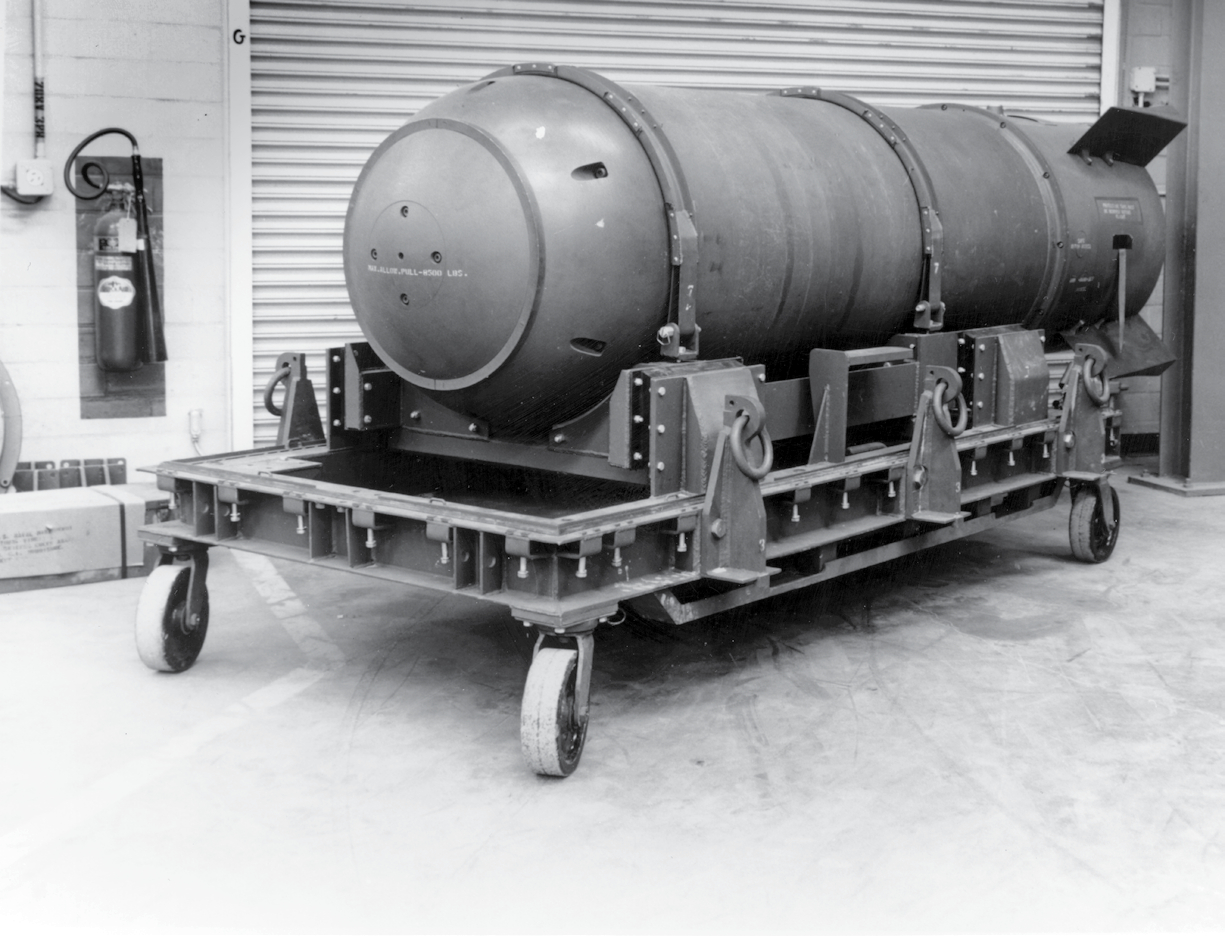
Mark 15 bomb

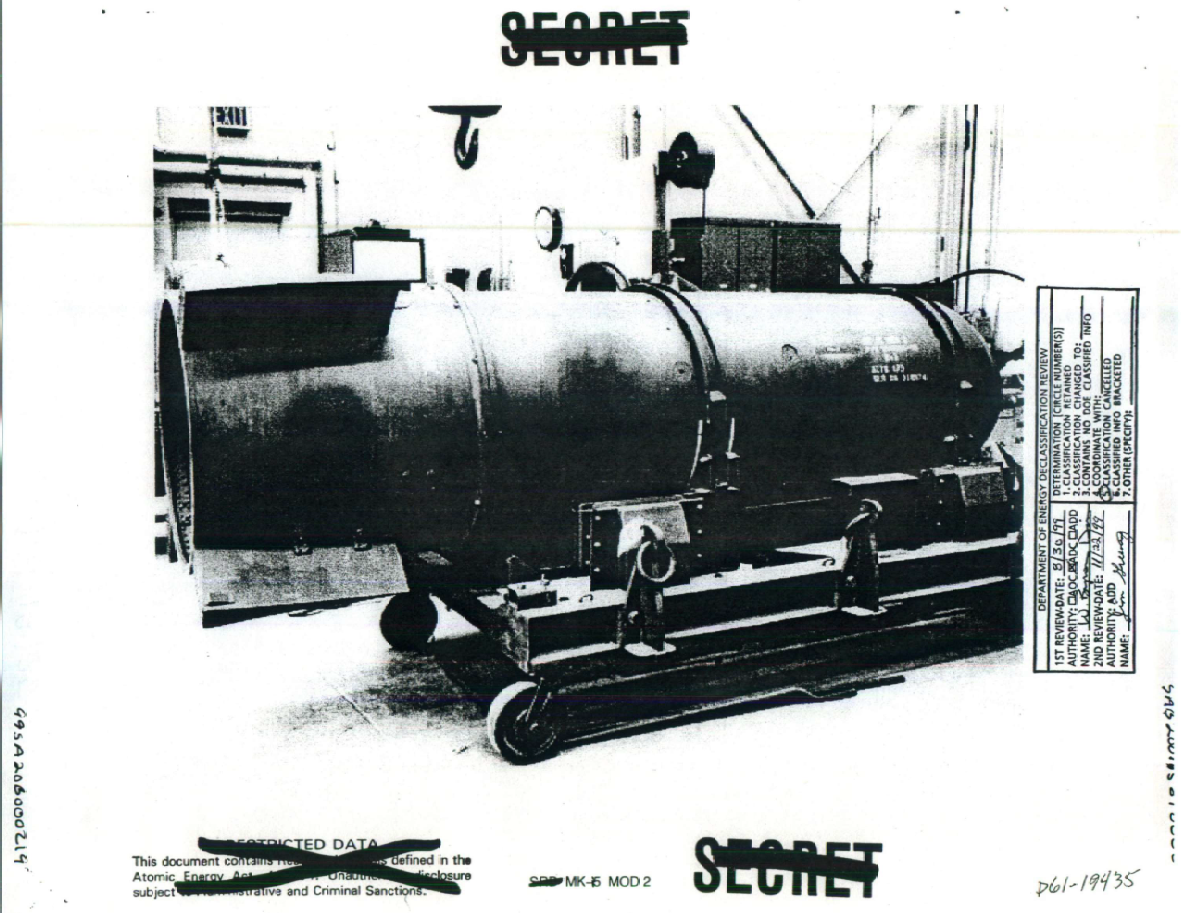
Side-rear view of the weapon

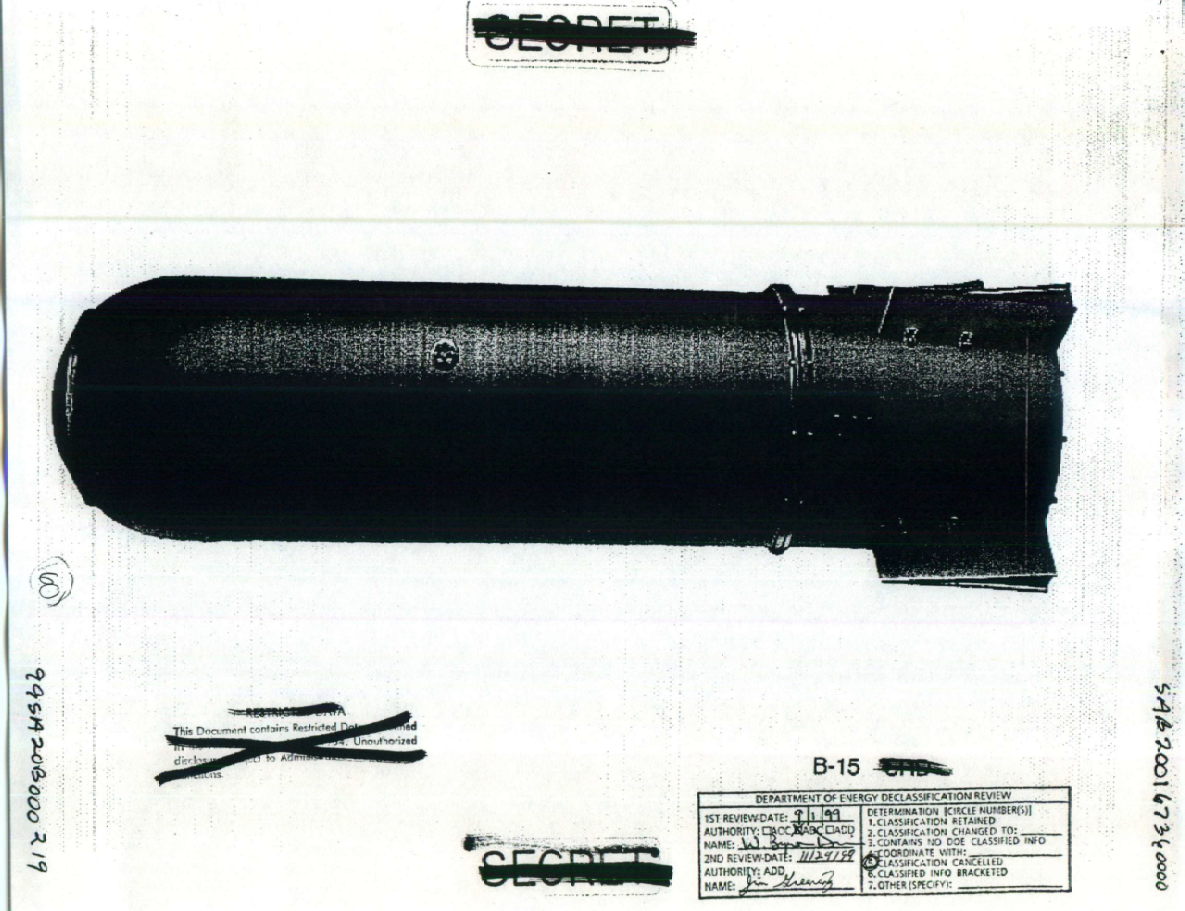
Side view of the weapon

The Mark 15 nuclear bomb, or Mk-15, was a 1950s American thermonuclear bomb, the first relatively lightweight (7,600 lb (3,400 kg)) thermonuclear bomb created by the United States.

A total of 1,200 Mark 15 bombs were produced from 1955 to 1957. There were three production variants: Mod 1, Mod 2, and Mod 3. The design was in service from 1955 to 1965.

== Specifications ==
All three models were generally physically similar; weight of around 7,600 lb (3,400 kg), diameter of 34.4 to 35 in (87 to 89 cm), length of 136 to 140 in (350 to 360 cm).

== Models ==
The Mod 1 corresponds to the Castle Nectar test of the Zombie weapon prototype. This test had a yield of 1.69 megatons of TNT (7.1 petajoules).

The Mod 2 corresponds to the Redwing Cherokee nuclear test of the TX-15-X1 test model, and had a yield of 3.8 Mt (16 PJ). Redwing Cherokee was the first US thermonuclear bomb airdrop test.

The Mod 3 also appears to have had a 3.8 Mt (16 PJ) yield.

=== W15 ===
A missile warhead variant of the Mark 15, the W15 Warhead, was an ongoing project in the mid 1950s. It was canceled in early 1957. Before cancellation, it had been intended for use on the SM-62 Snark missile. Instead, the Snark ended up using the W39 (see below).

== Derivatives ==
The W39 nuclear warhead and B39 nuclear bomb used a common nuclear physics package which was derived from the Mark 15. The experimental W39 devices were initially tested as the TX-15-X3 (which is identical to the W39 Mod 0 design).

== Dropped and lost ==
On February 5, 1958, during a training mission flown by a B-47, a Mk 15 nuclear bomb, was lost off the coast of Tybee Island, Georgia near Savannah.

Initially, experts disputed whether the bomb was nuclear or not. If it contains a plutonium core, it is a fully functional nuclear weapon. If the core was replaced with a dummy, it would be non-nuclear but still capable of creating a conventional explosion. After the incident, the Air Force assured the public that the nuclear capsule was removed prior to the flight and fitted with a simulated 150-pound cap made of lead.

However, according to 1966 Congressional testimony by Assistant Secretary of Defense W.J. Howard, the Tybee Island bomb was a "complete weapon, a bomb with a nuclear capsule" and one of two weapons lost that contained a plutonium trigger.

== See also ==
- List of nuclear weapons
- Operation Castle
- Operation Redwing
