= 1961 Yuba City B-52 crash =

Crash of a nuclear-armed U.S. Air Force plane in northern California

Yuba City B-52 Crash
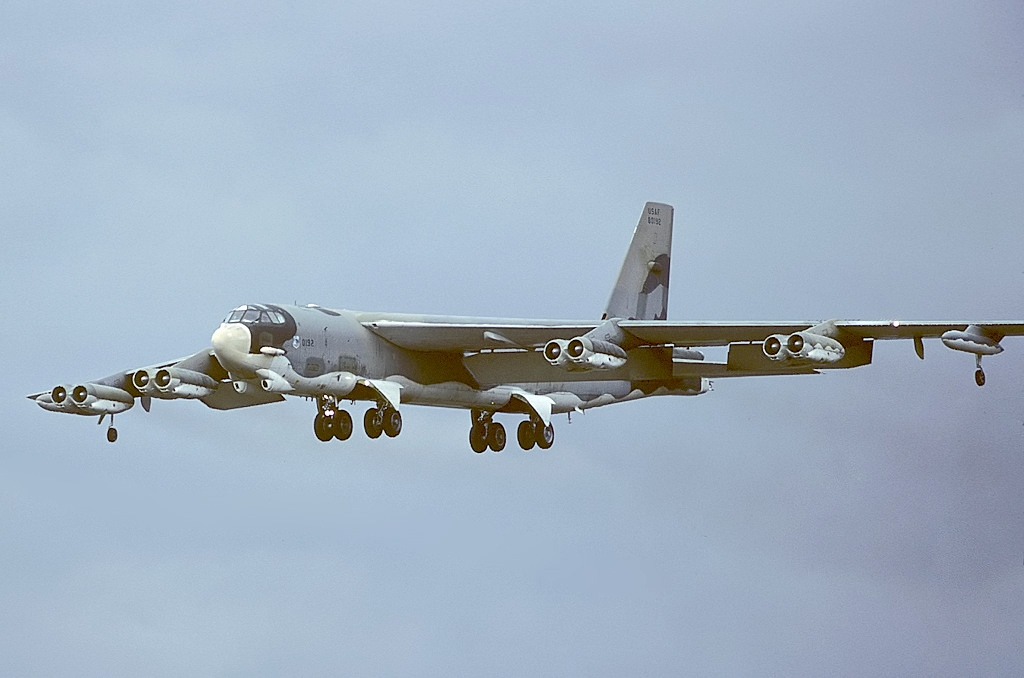
- A Boeing B-52 Stratofortress similar to the accident aircraft

Accident
- Date: 14 March 1961
- Summary: Uncontrolled decompression; fuel exhaustion
- Site: Sutter County, 15 mi (24 km) west of Yuba City, California; 39.1167°N 121.8833°W

Aircraft
- Aircraft type: Boeing B-52F Stratofortress
- Operator: Strategic Air Command, United States Air Force
- Registration: 57-0166
- Flight origin: Mather Air Force Base
- Crew: 8
- Fatalities: 0
- Survivors: 8

On 14 March 1961 an aircraft accident occurred near Yuba City, California. A United States Air Force B-52F-70-BW Stratofortress bomber, AF Serial No. 57-0166, c/n 464155, carrying two nuclear weapons departed from Mather Air Force Base near Sacramento. According to the official Air Force report, the aircraft experienced an uncontrolled decompression that required it to descend to 10,000 feet (3,000 m) in order to lower the cabin altitude. Increased fuel consumption caused by having to fly at lower altitude, combined with the inability to rendezvous with a tanker in time caused the aircraft to run out of fuel. The aircrew ejected safely, and the now uncrewed aircraft crashed 15 miles (24 km) west of Yuba City, tearing the nuclear weapons from the aircraft on impact. The weapons did not detonate, as their safety devices worked properly. A fireman was killed and several others injured in a road accident while en route to the accident scene.

== Timeline ==
Crash site in California

The following timeline is an abridged version of the description transcribed by Oskins and Maggelet from a declassified copy of the original Air Force accident report. Doe 11 was the aircraft call sign. Doe 13 was a second B-52 in formation for the first portion of the flight.

All times are hours and minutes after takeoff.

0:20 – the pilot first noticed excessive hot air coming from the pilots' vents. All attempts to control this hot air were unsuccessful.

6:00 – Mather Command Post contacted the aircraft on HF radio. The heat problem was discussed and wing guidance received. This consisted of several suggested corrective actions which were verified by the pilot as having been used earlier without success.

6:30 – Mather control room called the aircraft on HF radio and discussed the heat problem and the effects of the heat on the aircraft electronics and crew personnel. Wing guidance at this time was to continue the mission.

6:50 – Mather control room contacted the aircraft and Wing guidance was to "continue mission as long as you can; call us back after second refueling tonight and advise us of your status, if it gets intolerable, of course, bring it home."

11:15 – Mather control called Doe 11 to see if he would complete the mission. At that the response was, "We are going to try."

12:35 – Mather control was contacted by Doe 11 and told that Doe 13's refueling was completed and "we are about ready to take off." Control asked, "Your present status . . . has it improved?" The pilot answered "Negative . . . worse . . . number 3 engine setting at 70% . . . we had it once before and it cleared up but at this time it has not cleared as yet." Control advised, "Understand you will proceed on course and we will be looking for you tomorrow."

14:00 – the outside panel of the pilot's L-4 window shattered. The heat in the cockpit was unbearable at this time and had cracked the glass case for the ball on both pilot's and co-pilot's turn and slip indicators. It is estimated that the upper compartment heat level ranged from 125–160 °F (52–71 °C) or higher during this period. A decision was made to depressurize the aircraft and attempt to continue the mission. Altitude was 33,500 feet (10,200 m).

14:20 – after 20 minutes of unpressurized flight, the decision was made to descend to 12,000 feet (3,700 m) and continue the mission as far as possible at this altitude.

15:00 – Mather control contacted Doe 11 and asked "Which windshield is cracked and what is your present altitude?" Answer received, "The L-4 window shattered, heat unbearable at altitude, two sick crew members. We have descended to 12,000 feet [3,700 m] and plan to go 150 nmi [280 km] north of TP 3.19 and return direct to Mather." They were advised to "proceed as planned, recommend you stay low altitude, give us an estimate on your fuel as soon as you get in close enough to contact us."

16:50 – Mather control contacted Doe 11 via HF radio requesting ETA to Mather. The aircraft reported, "We just passed TP 3.19 at 1212Z, estimate 150 nautical miles [280 km] north of TP 3.19 at 1239Z, ETA to Mather 1755Z."

18:50 – Mather control contacted the aircraft through HF radio to check his progress.

19:45 – McClellan called for flight plan and altitude required from last position to Mather.

20:30 – aircraft contacted McClellan to ask Early Warning vessel "Hardware" to look out for them and would like a fix. (Note: Note: Here the term 'fix' means a determination of position coordinates. It does not mean 'fix' as in a repair.)

21:00 – the aircraft contacted Mather control stating, "We would like a tanker up here and get a little fuel. We now figure we will be over the field at 14,000 pounds [6,400 kg]. That is a little light. We would like to have a tanker." And, control answered Doe 11 "will be cleared for a straight in approach and will have tanker standby . . . we will not launch unless you go below 10,000 pounds [4,500 kg]."

Doe 11's ETA to Mather at this time was given as approximately 22:30 hours after takeoff.

For approximately the next hour, several heading deviations up to 30 degrees were made by the pilot of Doe 11 to circumnavigate the weather associated with a front in this area. Turbulence was moderate. It is estimated from study of weather and Doe 11 pilot and navigator interviews that 7 or 8 minutes were lost during this frontal penetration due to these heading deviations.

21:50 – Mather was contacted through HF radio and advised he had, "#1 main tank gauge stuck at 10,030 pounds [4,550 kg] . . . we are not sure just how much fuel we have in it now. We have No. 2 and one other 1/4 full warning light on and I think it would be a good idea to get that tanker airborne." Mather Control Room advised, "We have a tanker airborne. Pick him up at Red Bluff VOR and refuel back in this direction. You might keep in mind, if things get a little close up there, head into Beale AFB." Later in this same conversation, Mather control indicated, "We will get it off the ground here ASAP."

22:10 – Democrat contacted the aircraft on HF advising, "McClellan is requesting your present position." The aircraft advised, " . . . just coasted in and looking for our tanker." This was the last contact through Democrat HF radio.

22:10 – the tanker was launched.

22:23 – the bomber and the tanker initiated the head on rendezvous at 70 nautical miles (130 km). Normal mileage countdown was used and the bomber turned the tanker at 21 nmi (39 km). This left Doe 11 flying at 280 kn (520 km/h) IAS approximately 11 nmi (20 km) behind the tanker after the tanker rolled out on refueling track. The bomber asked the tanker to slow down. The tanker reduced speed to 200 kn (370 km/h) IAS, and then to 185 kn (343 km/h) IAS. The bomber maintained 280 kn (520 km/h) IAS to approximately 2 nmi (3.7 km) behind this tanker, and then lost power. The pilot had warned the crew earlier of the possibility of bailout and he now alerted them to prepare for bailout. He initiated a 30-degree bank to the west toward a clear area as all engines flamed out together at approximately 22:40 hours after takeoff.

The bailout sequence began at approximately 7,000 feet (2,100 m) with an outside temperature of approximately 42 °F (6 °C), and was normal except the gunner could not jettison his turret despite full strength pull on the inner emergency release handle. The gunner was called forward and bailed out the navigator hatch, using the spare chute in the forward compartment. The pilot continued to guide the aircraft toward a clear area. The crew continued to bail out in order of navigator, spare navigator, spare pilot, EW, gunner, co-pilot and radar navigator. The pilot bailed out at 4,000 feet (1,200 m). The aircraft was trimmed and calculated to be at approximately a 21:1 glide ratio at this time. The aircraft made one complete 360-degree left turn and crashed into a clear flat barley field area 15.75 miles (25.35 km) west of Yuba County Airport, California, at approximately 22:50 after takeoff. The aircraft struck the ground at a 15.3-degree left bank and an estimated attitude of 5 degrees nose down at an indicated airspeed of approximately 200 knots (370 km/h). Impact angle was approximately 45 degrees.

== Bombs ==
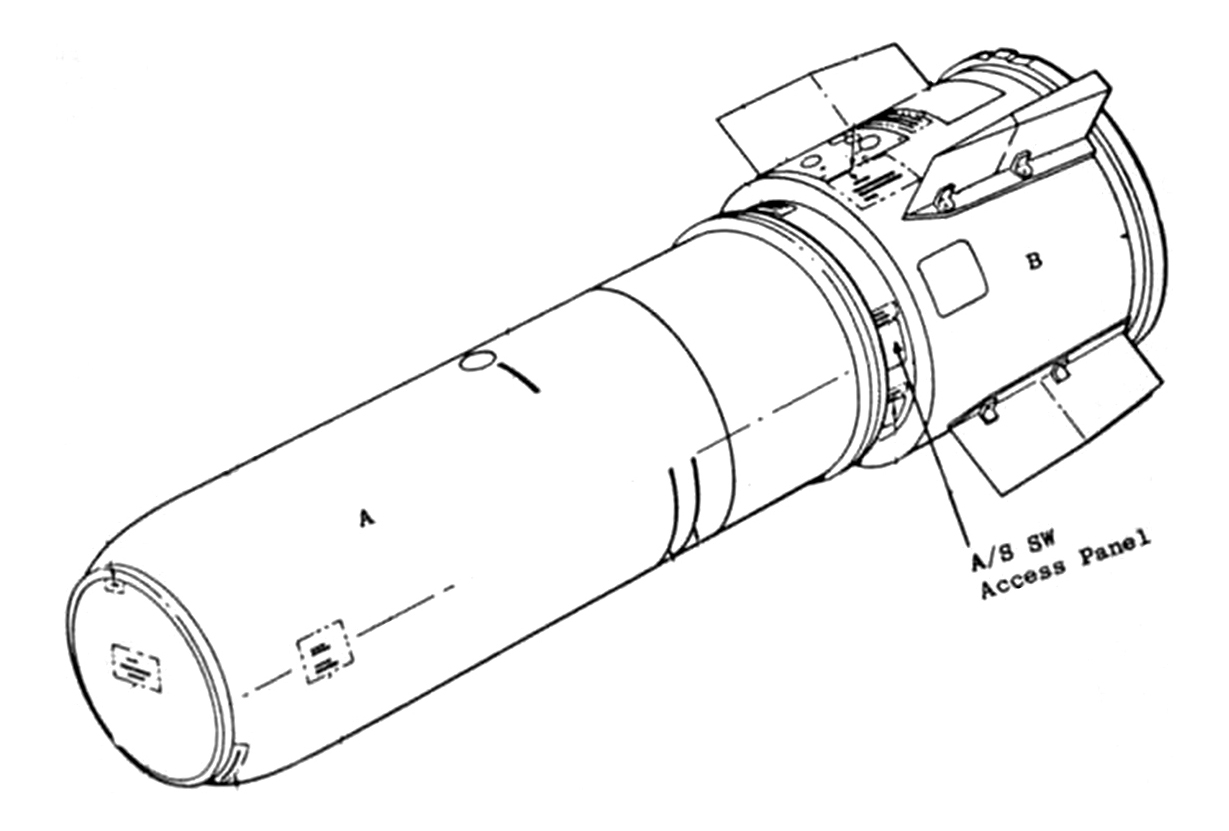
A diagram of the external features of the Mark 39 Mod 2 casing, showing the forward section containing the warhead (A), the rear section containing the parachute pack (B), and the location of the Arm/Safe Switch access panel.

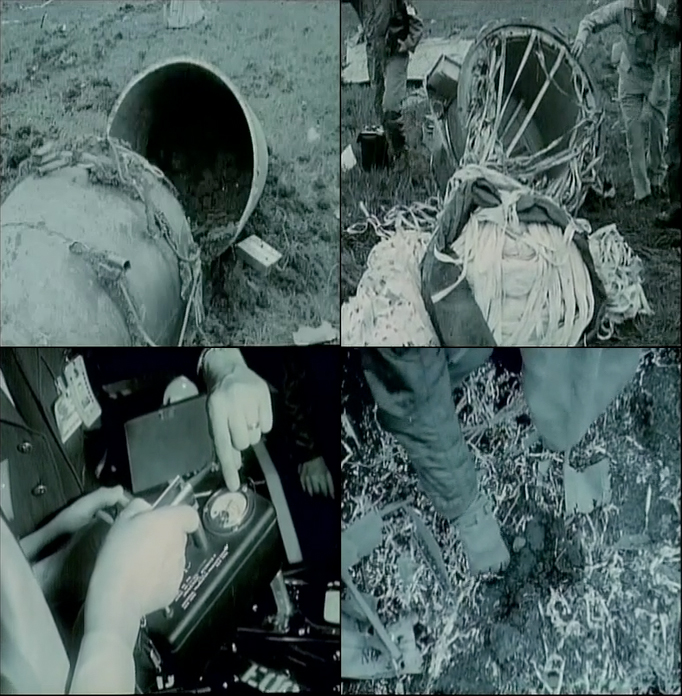
Stills from a film of the Explosive Ordnance Disposal activities after the crash showing (clockwise from top left): possibly the forward ballistic casing, or broken primary sphere, of one of the Mark 39 nuclear bombs thrown from the aircraft upon impact; the afterbody and parachute of one of the bombs; an EOD technician picking up what is likely a piece of scattered high-explosive from the bomb which broke apart during the crash; an EOD technician adjusts and uses a Geiger counter

The B-52 carried two 3.8-megaton, sealed pit thermonuclear Mark 39 Mod 2 bombs arranged in tandem in its bomb bay. Both weapons were thrown from the aircraft on impact and "severely damaged."

The weapon from the rear bomb rack was found still mostly intact, with its nuclear components inside of its ballistic drop case. The arming "pull out" rods necessary to start its arming sequence had been extracted, and its internal timer had been activated. Its tritium reservoir had been broken off, but the gas reservoir was still full. Its high explosives were severely damaged ("crumbled").

The other weapon, in the forward bomb rack, separated from the aircraft upon impact. Its "pull out" rods were extracted and its timer had also begun. The warhead had "tumbled several times", and the boosted-fission "primary" stage, and most of the fission-fusion "secondary" stage, were thrown out of the ballistic case. The primary was destroyed, with its high explosives shattered and scattered, and its enriched uranium pit separated from the assembly. Its detonators were found scattered over a large area, and its tritium reservoir had separated but had remained full. Neither weapon suffered a high-explosive detonation, and there was no nuclear contamination. The Arm/Safe switches in both weapons were discovered in the "Safe" position.

As part of Explosive Ordnance Disposal procedure, personnel from Beale Air Force Base and McClellan Air Force Base removed the two tritium reservoirs and the separated pit on March 14. The next day, EOD personnel collected the scattered high explosives, as well as the high-explosive sphere from the intact weapon, and burned them. The weapon parts were returned to the Atomic Energy Commission.

The weapons in the Yuba City crash were the same type of bombs as had been involved in the 1961 Goldsboro B-52 crash a few weeks earlier, except they had been subjected to a safety modification that the Goldsboro weapons had not. The safety modification, designated Alt 197, replaced the older MC-722 Arm/Safe switch with the newer MC-1288 Arm/Safe switch, with the main difference being that the latter would not allow the charging of the low-voltage thermal batteries inside of the weapon if the switch was in the "Safe" position, reducing the chance that a faulty switch or a short circuit could initiate the weapon's detonation system inadvertently.

However, despite the switches being in "Safe" position in the Yuba City accident, the low-voltage thermal batteries in one of the weapons still activated. According to the Defense Atomic Support Agency, "post-mortem analysis indicates a probable cause of the activation of the low voltage thermal batteries of the one weapon was a cable short which permitted the energy from the MC-845 Bisch Generator to bypass the MC-1288 Arm/Safe Switch. It is suspected that the MC-845 pulse resulted from the mechanical shock sustained upon impact and was passed to the MC-640 [thermal batteries] through one of the possible random short circuits." The high-voltage batteries of neither weapon were actuated, and in both cases it was later judged that "all design safety features of the bombs performed adequately".

== Book ==
In a 2012 book, lieutenant colonel Earl McGill, a retired Strategic Air Command B-52 pilot, claims that the aircrew, after an inflight refueling session that provided inadequate fuel, refused the offer of an additional, unscheduled inflight refueling, bypassed possible emergency landing fields, and ran out of fuel. McGill, based on his experience, blames the aircrew failures on the use of dexedrine to overcome tiredness on the 24-hour flight preceding the accident.

== See also ==
- List of accidents and incidents involving military aircraft
