= Proving ground =

Place or situation where thing or person is tried or tested

A proving ground is an installation or reservation in which technology such as weapons, military tactics and automobile prototypes are experimented with or tested. Proving grounds can be operated by government bodies or civilian industries. They are distinct from military training areas which are run by the military and intended for the routine training and exercising of troops across the terrain.

== Military and government ==
=== Australia ===
- Monegeetta Proving Ground, Victoria, Australia (54 km north of Melbourne)

=== Germany ===
- Peenemünde Army Research Centre, WW2 guided missile and rocket development and testing centre

=== Portugal ===
- Field Firing Range of Alcochete, Lisbon and Tagus Valley region, an artillery and bombing range facility opened in 1904, under Portuguese Air Force control since 1993, but also used by other military branches and law enforcement agencies for training purposes. With a surface area of 7,539 hectares, it is located roughly 30 km east of Lisbon. This proving ground is planned to close and relocate (possibly to Mértola, Alentejo) owing to the construction of Luís de Camões Airport (planned to open in 2034).

=== Russia / Former Soviet Union ===
In Russia, a designated area is usually called a "polygon".

- Kapustin Yar, aerial weapons and rocket test range used by the North Caucasus Military District
- Pan'kovo test range, missile test range on Novaya Zemlya, best known for tests of 9M730 Burevestnik
- State Central Navy Testing Range, missile test range in Arkhangelsk Oblast, best known for the Nyonoksa radiation accident
- Totskoye Range, test range in Orenburg Oblast, Russia, best known for the Totskoye nuclear exercise, 1954
- Yakutia Challenge, winter test proving ground in Yakutia, Eastern Siberia

=== South Korea ===
- Anheung Proving Ground, Taean County
- Changwon Proving Ground, Changwon City
- Darakdae Proving Ground, Pocheon City

=== Sweden ===
- Bofors Test Center

=== United States ===
In the United States, there are several military facilities that have been explicitly designated as proving grounds.

- Aberdeen Proving Ground, a United States Army facility in Aberdeen, Maryland. It is the Army's oldest active proving ground, established on 20 October 1917, six months after the United States entered World War I. It was created so that design and testing of ordnance materiel could be carried out in proximity to the nation's industrial and shipping centers at the time.
- Dugway Proving Ground, an active facility operated by the United States Army Test and Evaluation Command in the Great Salt Lake Desert of Utah. Dugway's mission is to test U.S. and Allied biological and chemical weapon defense systems.
- Fort Belvoir Proving Ground, in Fairfax County, Virginia
- Indian Head Naval Surface Warfare Center, located in Indian Head, Maryland and at one time called the Indian Head Proving Ground
- Jefferson Proving Ground, in Madison, Indiana. It was principally a munitions testing facility of Test and Evaluation Command of the United States Army Materiel Development and Readiness Command. The facility was ordered closed in 1989 as part of the Base Realignment and Closure (BRAC) process.
- Nevada Test and Training Range (NTTR) and the adjacent Nevada National Security Site (NNSS, formerly known as the Nevada Proving Grounds), both located at the Nellis Air Force Base Complex, in southern Nevada.
- Pacific Proving Grounds, an inactive U.S. Department of Energy area in the Marshall Islands that were established by the U.S. Atomic Energy Commission in 1946 for nuclear weapons testing. It mainly consists of Bikini Atoll, Enewetak Atoll & the surrounding area, and was deactivated in 1963.
- Sandy Hook Proving Ground, in Sandy Hook, New Jersey, was the nation's first such facility. It was created in 1874 and was used as a proving ground until 1919.
- Scituate Proving Ground, a former proving ground in Scituate, Massachusetts, operational from 1918 to 1921
- Yuma Proving Ground, a United States Army facility situated in southwestern La Paz County and western Yuma County in southwestern Arizona, approximately 30 miles (48 km) northeast of the city of Yuma. The proving ground is used for testing military equipment and encompasses 1,307.8 square miles (3,387.2 km²) in the Sonoran Desert.

== Automotive ==
Automotive proving grounds or automotive test tracks serve the automotive industry for road vehicle testing. In the automotive development process, vehicle manufacturers typically test the behaviour of vehicles in various environments and traffic situations. Conventional vehicle testing usually focuses on the dynamic properties of vehicles. Test tracks generally encompass the engineering tasks of vehicle testing and validation.

With the advent of self-driving cars, new proving grounds specially dedicated for them have appeared, and existing conventional proving grounds have been retooled for the testing of highly automated or fully autonomous vehicles.

=== Automaker-owned ===
- Chrysler Proving Grounds
- Ford Proving Grounds
- General Motors Proving Grounds
- Hyundai Ulsan proving ground
- Hyundai Hwaseong proving ground
- Hällered Proving Ground (Volvo Cars)
- Mazda Proving Grounds
- Nissan Proving Grounds
- Nardò Ring (Porsche)
- Ehra-Lessien test track (Volkswagen)

=== Independent ===
- AUREL CZ polygon, Czech Republic
- Applus+ IDIADA proving ground, Spain
- Arctic Falls Proving Grounds, several facilities and locations both outdoors and indoors in and around Älvsbyn, Sweden
- 4activeSystems Test Track, Traboch, Austria. An all-in-one test track next to 4activeSystems' headquarters, an testing equipment manufacturer for ADAS and autonomous driving.
- AstaZero, claimed to have world's longest indoor track for testing "active" safety systems and autonomous technologies, Sandhult, Sweden
- Baudette Proving Ground by Bosch, USA
- Boxberg Proving Ground by Bosch, Germany
- Bridgestone proving grounds, various locations
- Colmis Proving Ground on land and frozen lake, Arjeplog, Sweden
- Hwaseong Songsan proving ground, South Korea
- Automotive Testing Papenburg, Germany
- Bruntingthorpe Airfield & Proving Ground, United Kingdom
- Digitrans Automotive Proving Ground, St. Valentin, Austria
- Donghai Proving Ground by Bosch, China
- Flat Rock Proving Ground by Bosch, USA
- HORIBA MIRA, United Kingdom
- Lang Lang Proving Ground, Australia
- GoMentum Station, United States
- Icemakers, Arjeplog, Sweden
- Juvincourt Proving Ground by Bosch, France
- Maxxis Proving Ground Test Track, Kunshan, China
- Memanbetsu Proving Ground by Bosch, Japan
- Michigan Technical Resource Park, USA
- Millbrook Proving Ground, United Kingdom
- Shiobara Proving Ground by Bosch, Japan
- Sottozero Centre by Pirelli, Flurheden, Sweden
- Southern Hemisphere Proving Grounds, New Zealand
- Tjintokk, Slagnäs, Sweden
- Tolhuin Proving Ground by Bosch, Argentina
- TRIWO Automotive Testing Center, near Frankfurt and Saarbrücken, Germany
- UTAC, headquartered in Linas-Montlhéry France where it operates Autodrome de Linas-Montlhéry operational since 1924 the first of its eight proving grounds located in 10 countries.
- Vaitoudden proving ground by Bosch, Sweden
- Yakeshi Proving Ground by Bosch, China
- ZalaZone Automotive Proving Ground, Hungary
