= Sopka =

Sopka may refer to:

- Katherine Sopka, American scientist
- S-2 Sopka, Soviet coastal defense system
- Sopka (mound), a type of tumulus
- Sopka (hill), a Russian landform designation
- Sopka, Arkhangelsk Oblast, village in Russia
- Šopka, a Macedonian circle dance from the region of Kratovo
