= Nyonoksa radiation accident =

2019 radiation accident in Russia

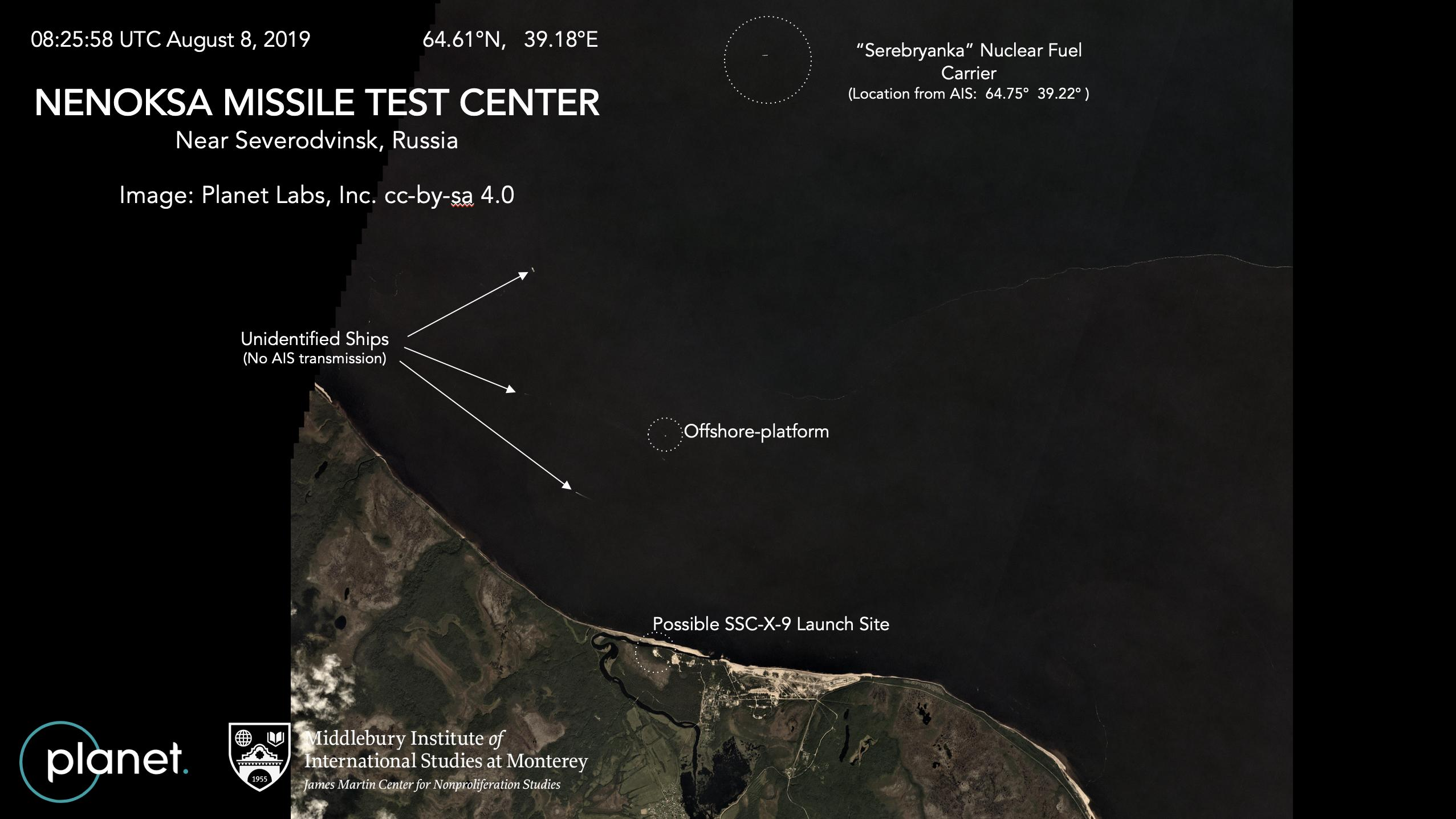
- Date: 8 August 2019; 7 years ago
- Location: State Central Navy Testing Range near Nyonoksa, Arkhangelsk Oblast, Russian Federation
- Type: Nuclear and radiation accident
- Cause: Explosive destruction of an "isotope power source" (officially). Allegedly a failed 9M730 Burevestnik nuclear-powered cruise missile test/recovery.
- Deaths: 5

Nyonoksa radiation accident (Russia)

The Nyonoksa radiation accident, Arkhangelsk explosion or Nyonoksa explosion (Russian: Инцидент в Нёноксе, romanized: Intsident v Nyonokse) occurred on 8 August 2019 near Nyonoksa, a village under the administrative jurisdiction of Severodvinsk, Arkhangelsk Oblast, Russian Federation. Five military and civilian specialists were killed and three (or six, depending on the source) were injured.

== Background ==
Between November 2017 and 26 February 2018, Russia conducted four tests of the 9M730 Burevestnik nuclear-powered cruise missile, launched from other test sites. According to the United States intelligence community, only the flight test in November 2017 from Pankovo test site was moderately successful with all of the others ending in failure. According to Russia, none of the tests ended in failure. During recovery efforts later in 2018, Russia used three ships, one capable of handling radioactive material from a nuclear reactor core, to bring the missile tested in November 2017 from the seabed of Barents Sea back to the surface. Based on satellite images, the Nyonoksa test site copies those at Kapustin Yar and Pankovo, where 9M730 Burevestnik was tested.

== Accident ==
The accident occurred at the State Central Navy Testing Range (Russian: Государственный центральный морской полигон) which is the main rocket launching site of the Russian Navy and is also called Nyonoksa. According to the version presented by Russian officials, it was a result of a failed test of an "isotope power source for a liquid-fuelled rocket engine". Nonproliferation expert Jeffrey Lewis and Federation of American Scientists fellow Ankit Panda suspect the incident resulted from a Burevestnik cruise missile test. However, other arms control experts disputed the assertions: Ian Williams of the Center for Strategic and International Studies and James Acton of the Carnegie Endowment for International Peace expressed skepticism over Moscow's financial and technical capabilities to field the weapon, while Michael Kofman of the Wilson Center concluded that the explosion was probably not related to Burevestnik but instead to the testing of another military platform. According to CNBC, the Russians were trying to recover a missile from the seabed which was lost during a previously failed test. No NOTAMs were filed prior to the explosion to warn pilots of a possible missile test. In the past, the residents of Nyonoksa had been warned and evacuated prior to the missile tests. Also, two Russian special purpose ships were at the Nyonoksa test range when the explosion occurred: the Serebryanka (Rosatom Flot vessel used for handling nuclear waste from nuclear reactors) and the Zvezdochka (used for underwater salvage operations and equipped with two heavy lift sea cranes and two remotely operated vehicles).

An event of explosive nature was registered on 8 August at 06:00 UTC (local time 09:00) at the infrasound station in Bardufoss (Troms, Norway). As the event was also registered on seismic data, it must have been coupled to the ground, meaning that it took place either at the ground or in contact with it; for example on water. The timing and location of the event coincides with the reported accident in Arkhangelsk. Several fishermen stated on sanatatur.ru that they witnessed the accident: one saw a 100-meter column of water rise into the air after the explosion and another saw a large hole in the side of a ship which had been at the site of the explosion.

== Aftermath ==
In the aftermath of the explosion, three of the victims were treated at the Semashko Medical Center in Arkhangelsk, which had radiation treatment expertise and employed the use of hazmat suits, while three others were taken to the Arkhangelsk Regional Clinical Hospital, arriving at 4:35 p.m. on 8 August, where the hospital staff were not warned of the radiation exposure. Several Arkhangelsk Regional Hospital staff were later flown to Moscow for radiation testing. One doctor was found to test positive for caesium-137, though the levels remain unknown, as the medical staff involved were forced to sign non-disclosure agreements.

According to an unnamed medical worker, two injured by the explosion died of radiation sickness en route from Arkhangelsk Regional Clinical Hospital (AOKB) (Russian: Архангельская областная клиническая больница (АОКБ)) to treatment in Moscow. Their bodies were sent to Moscow's Burnazyan Federal Medical and Biophysical Center (FMBC) (Russian: ГНЦ Федеральный медицинский биофизический центр имени А. И. Бурназяна ФМБА России). (Note: On 27 December 2007, the Clinical Hospital No. 6 (Russian: Клиническая больница № 6) merged with the Institute of Biophysics of the FMBA of Russia (Russian: Институт биофизики ФМБА России) to become the SSC A. I. Burnazyan Federal Medical Biophysical Center (FMBC) which was named after Avetik Ignatevich Burnazyan (Russian: Аветик Игнатьевич Бурназян) and became the only Federal Medical Biophysical Center (FMBC) (Russian: ГНЦ Федеральный медицинский биофизический центр имени А. И. Бурназяна ФМБА России) that specializes in contaminated persons exposed to high levels of ionizing radiation from radiological incidents such as at Mayak and Chernobyl. Burnazyan is the flagship Russian medical center for biophysics, radiation and nuclear medicine and safety.) Six persons with severe injuries from the explosion and radiation exposure were delivered to Burnazyan by two medevac flights and ambulances with special plastic seals, with paramedics wearing chemical protective suits, and, because an operating room apron was highly contaminated after an operation, all Arkhangelsk Regional Hospital doctors, nurses, and staff who came into contact with the injured were sent to Burnazyan, too. The rooms at the Arkangelsk hospital, where injured victims had been treated, were sealed after treatment but none of the hospital workers and staff had worn anti-contamination clothing.

=== Five immediate deaths ===
On Monday 12 August 2019, flags in Sarov were lowered to half-mast during the viewing of five coffins in Sarov's main square. These were the bodies of five Rosatom (RFNC-VNIIEF) (Note: As of August 2019, the Research Institute of Experimental Physics is a very large research complex with these institutes: theoretical and mathematical physics, gas dynamics and explosion physics, nuclear and radiation physics, laser physical research, and the Scientific and Technical Complex also known as the KB, which consists of KB-1 (nuclear charges), KB-2 (nuclear munitions), KB-3 (special security), and KB-12 (special topics).) workers (Note: According to the head of Rosatom, Alexei Likhachev (Russian: Алексей Лихачев), the five Rosatom workers killed were Alexei Vyushin (Russian: Алексей Вьюшин), Evgeny Koratayev (Russian: Евгений Коротаев), Vyacheslav Lipshev (Russian: Вячеслав Липшев), Sergei Pichugin (Russian: Сергей Пичугин), and Vladislav Yanovsky (Russian: Владислав Яновский). All of them were from the Scientific and Technical Complex (Russian: Научно-технический комплекс) design bureau 12 (KB-12) "special topics" (Russian: КБ-12 (специальная тематика)): Alexey Vyushin was a special hardware and software developer, Evgeny Koratayev was the lead engineer, Vyacheslav Lipshev led the research and development team, Sergey Pichugin was the test engineer, and Vladislav Yanovsky was the deputy head of the research and testing department.) who were killed during and immediately following the 8 August 2019 explosion. Later, on 12 August 2019, their bodies were buried in Sarov's main cemetery. On 21 November 2019, they were posthumously awarded the Order of Courage.

=== Radiation levels ===
Yuri Peshkov from the Roshidromet, the Russian meteorology service, stated that background radiation levels peaked at 4–16 times normal levels at six of its eight stations in Severodvinsk, 47 kilometres (29 mi) to the east, reaching 1.78 microsieverts per hour shortly after the explosion, but returned to normal levels 2.5 hours after the explosion. The administration in Severodvinsk reported elevated radiation levels for 40 minutes leading to a rush on medical iodine. In the days following the event several monitoring stations in Russia stopped sending data to the Comprehensive Nuclear-Test-Ban Treaty Organization (CTBTO), a data network for radiation monitoring made of 80 stations around the world.

According to the information posted by Roshydromet on radiation situation in Severodvinsk in the hours following the accident, a number of short-lived isotopes were discovered: strontium-91, barium-139, barium-140 and lanthanum-140. Norwegian nuclear safety expert Nils Bøhmer stated that such isotope composition proves a nuclear reactor was involved in the accident.

External media

Images
- Two radioactive pontoons

Video
- Radiation measurements in Nyonoksa on YouTube

On 2 September, Belomorkanal news agency published a video showcasing two abandoned pontoons near the mouth of where the Nyonoksa River (Note: Verkhovka River (Russian: Река верховка) empties into Lake Nizhny (Russian: озеро Нижнее) which drains to the Nyonoksa River. The Nyonoksa River joins Lake Nizhny with the Dvina Bay of the White Sea.) empties into the Dvina Bay only 4 km from the center of Nyonoksa, with one of them carrying an array of heavily damaged testing equipment. According to Nyonoksa residents, the first pontoon "PP PP Plant No. 2" (Russian: «ПП ПП зав №2») with two 6-metre (20 ft) blue containers washed ashore on 9 August and the heavily damaged second pontoon with a damaged crane, a 6-metre (20 ft) blue container and a yellow container similar to a Siempelkamp container for highly radioactive materials was towed by tugboats to a site near the first pontoon about five days after the explosion. The video by Severodvinsk journalist Nikolai Karneyevich (Russian: Николай Карнеевич) demonstrates gamma radiation levels at 150 metres (490 ft) from the abandoned vessels on the White Sea shore close to Nyonoksa with the reading reaching 186 μR/hour - 15 times higher than natural. Nyonoksa residents said that just days prior to the 31 August measurements, the gamma ray radiation levels were 750 μR/hour at the same location. Alpha and beta radiation levels have not been measured. As of September 2019, the site has been neither enclosed nor guarded and no radiation warning signs have been observed.

Over 500 miles (800 km) away, tiny amounts of radioactive iodine, which were collected from 9–12 August, were detected at an air filter station in Svanhovd by Norway's nuclear safety authority. The agency could not determine if the detection was linked to the accident, and, according to Reuters, such iodine measurements were not unusual as monitoring stations in Norway detected radioactive iodine about six to eight times a year and also were usually unable to determine the source of the isotope.

=== Evacuation of population ===
According to the local press, it was announced that about 450 inhabitants of the Nyonoksa village had to be evacuated by train for two hours on 14 August then this evacuation would have been canceled. According to The Moscow Times quoting RIA Novosti, residents of Nyonoksa would be evacuated each month by special train for two hours (early Wednesday morning) for planned military activities in the city; evacuation that according to a villager already exists: it is expected, everyone is taken from the village about once a month, even if some remained behind. But now, after the last events, I think everyone will leave. The governor of the Arkhangelsk region (Igor Orlov) denied that the evacuation was an emergency, saying it was a routine measure, already "planned".

=== Subsequent test launches ===
Planet Labs satellite imagery from 20 September 2018 and from 18 September 2020 published by Middlebury Institute of International Studies at Monterey (MIIS) show how the Pan'kovo test range had been rebuilt subsequent to the accident.

Planet Labs satellite imagery from 7 August 2025 published by nuclear nonproliferation expert Jeffrey Lewis and MIIS was claimed by Lewis and by ICBM researcher Decker Eveleth to show test preparations of the Burevestnik at the Pan'kovo test range.

== Reactions ==
- Russia: Although initially denied, involvement of radioactive materials in the accident was later confirmed by Russian officials. On 13 August, the authorities initiated evacuation of the village of Nyonoksa. On 14 August the evacuation was cancelled. On 26 August, Aleksei Karpov, Russia's envoy to international organizations in Vienna, stated that the accident was linked to the development of weapons which Russia had to begin creating as "one of the tit-for-tat measures in the wake of the United States’ withdrawal from the Anti-Ballistic Missile Treaty". On 21 November, at the ceremony of presentation of posthumous awards to the dead men's families, Vladimir Putin stated that the scientists killed in the August 8th explosion had been testing an “unparalleled” weapon: “We are talking about the most advanced and unparalleled technical ideas and solutions about weapons design to ensure Russia’s sovereignty and security for decades to come". He also noted that the "weapon is to be perfected regardless of anything". On 22 November 2019, Dmitry Peskov, Putin's Press Secretary, stated that the investigation into the explosion will not be made public.
- U.S.: On 12 August a tweet from US president Donald Trump suggested that the accident was a failed Burevestnik test. In the tweet Burevestnik was referred to by its NATO reporting name "Skyfall". On 10 October, Thomas DiNanno, member of the United States delegation to the United Nations General Assembly First Committee, stated that the "August 8th 'Skyfall' incident [...] was the result of a nuclear reaction that occurred during the recovery of a Russian nuclear-powered cruise missile", which "remained on the bed of the White Sea since its failed test early last year". On 14 October, three United States diplomats were removed from the Nyonoksa-Severodvinsk train; Russia accused the diplomats of attempting to enter the closed city of Severodvinsk without the official permission, stating the diplomats had told Russia they were visiting Arkhangelsk, which wasn't within a restricted zone, but then traveled to the closed area next to the test site. The US Embassy in Russia and the State Department confirmed the incident, stating the diplomats were on official travel and had informed Russian authorities of their travel in advance.

== See also ==
- Andreev Bay nuclear accident
- Kramatorsk radiological accident
- Kyshtym disaster
- List of military nuclear accidents
- Nuclear and radiation accidents and incidents
