= 9M730 Burevestnik =

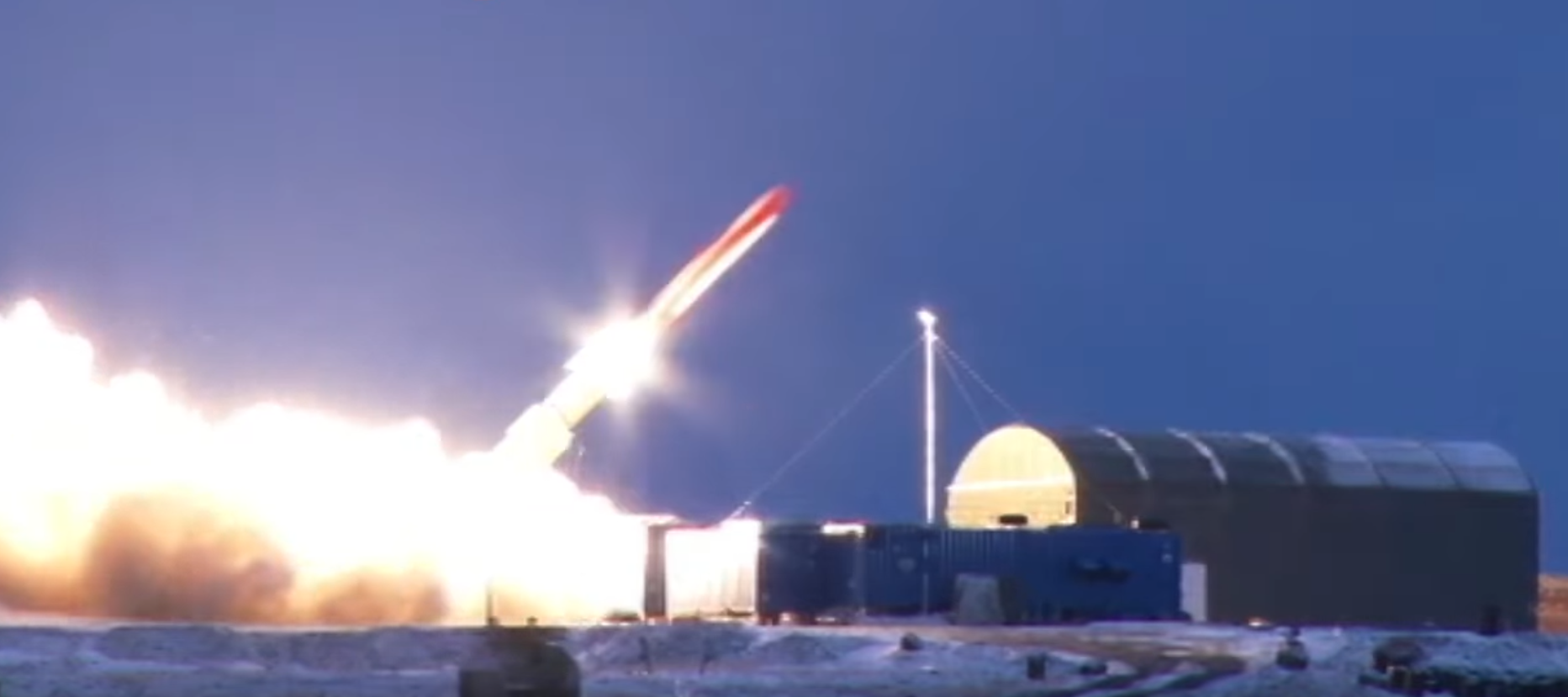
- 9M730 Burevestnik launch test on 1 March 2018
- Type: Nuclear-powered cruise missile
- Place of origin: Russia

Service history
- In service: Under development

Specifications
- Length: 12 m
- Effective firing range: Unknown (not limited by fuel capacity)
- Warhead: Thermonuclear weapon

The Burevestnik (Russian: Буревестник; "Storm petrel" GRAU: 9М730, NATO reporting name: SSC-X-9 Skyfall) is a Russian low-flying, nuclear-powered, nuclear-armed cruise missile under development for the Russian Armed Forces. According to the Russian Ministry of Defense, the missile's range is effectively unlimited.

The Burevestnik is one of the six new Russian strategic weapons unveiled by Russian president Vladimir Putin in 2018. This effort bears similarity to the discontinued US Project Pluto (1957–1964), which although functional, was considered more provocative, costly, ineffective, and radioisotope-emitting than intercontinental ballistic missiles.

According to the Nuclear Threat Initiative in 2024, "Burevestnik has a poor test record of at least 13 known tests, with only two partial successes, since 2016". In 2019, an explosion during a test caused the Nyonoksa radiation accident, killing five people and injuring others. According to Russian chief of the General Staff Valery Gerasimov, the missile flew 14,000 kilometres (8,700 mi) in a 15-hour flight, averaging 75% of the speed of sound, on 21 October 2025. It is considered the first nuclear-powered missile and nuclear-powered aircraft.

External videos
- Nuclear-powered cruise missile with unlimited range on YouTube
- "Burevestnik" cruise missile in a manufacturing plant on YouTube

== History ==
=== Motivation ===
Conventional rocket-propelled missiles have a limited flight time and range. Power from nuclear fission offers far more energy from a given mass of fuel which, if it could be used for propulsion, would hypothetically allow a missile to be launched far outside the defensive zone of a target, to take a circuitous route that avoids defenses, and to loiter for an extended period. However, according to Etienne Marcuz of the Foundation for Strategic Research its endurance would still be limited by the durability and lifespan of non-nuclear components and fluids in the system. The United States developed a Supersonic Low Altitude Missile nuclear-powered cruise missile during the 1950s, achieving successful full-power testing of Tory II-A and -C, but abandoned the project, in part due to the radioactive pollution produced by deployment.

=== Development ===
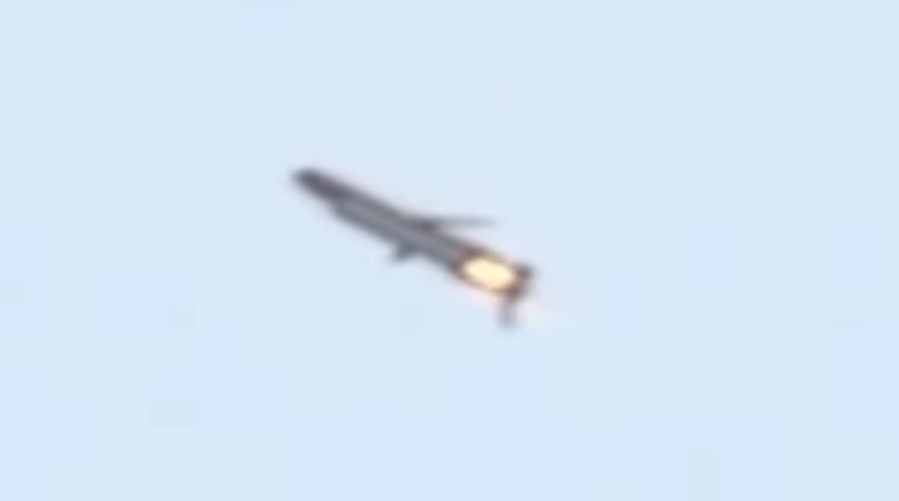
9M730 Burevestnik during test flight in March 2018

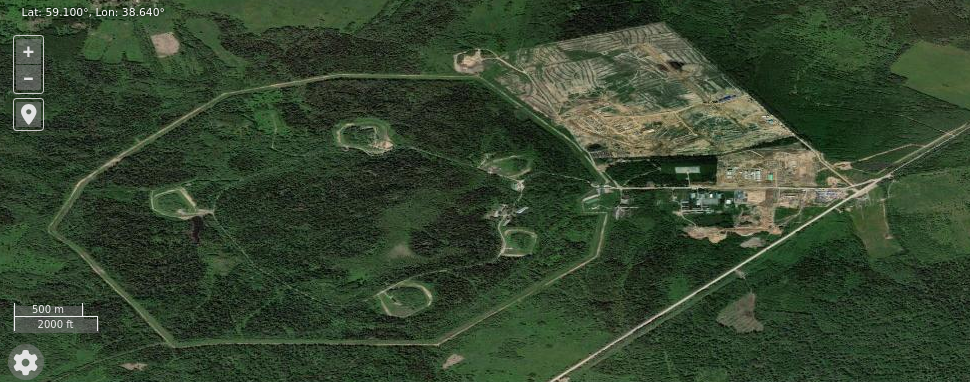
Satellite imagery of Vologda-20

The Russian defense industry began developing an intercontinental-range nuclear-powered cruise missile capable of penetrating any interceptor-based missile defense system in December 2001, after the USA abandoned the 1972 Anti-Ballistic Missile Treaty. According to Professor Mark Galeotti, this missile is a revived project from the Soviet times. It is said to have unlimited range and to be able to evade missile defenses. Russian news agency TASS reported in February 2019 that Burevestnik's nuclear power unit had been tested successfully.

According to a Russian newspaper, the missile was developed by All-Russian Scientific Research Institute of Experimental Physics in Sarov, and it is manufactured by NPO Novator in Yekaterinburg. According to another Russian newspaper, "Burevestnik" will be adopted by the Russian military no sooner than 2027. Its adoption will not violate the terms of the nuclear arms reduction treaty between the United States and the Russian Federation (New START), which Russia suspended (but did not leave) on 21 February 2023.

The cruise missile was named Burevestnik (Storm petrel, a seabird) as a result of an open vote on the Ministry of Defence of Russia's website.

On 5 October 2023, Russian president Vladimir Putin claimed that the missile had been successfully flight-tested, though Western media sources such as the BBC cast doubt on this claim, noting that there was no independent confirmation. According to the Nuclear Threat Initiative (NTI) in 2024, an advocacy group focused on reducing nuclear, biological and emergent technology risks, "The Burevestnik has a poor test record of at least 13 known tests, with only two partial successes, since 2016".

According to US researchers Decker Eveleth and Jeffrey Lewis, based on imagery analysis of 2024 launch pad construction and storage facilities, the probable deployment site for the Burevestnik is Vologda-20 located 15 km southwest of Chebsara, around 475 km (295 miles) north of Moscow.

Russian Chief of General Staff General Valery Gerasimov said that Burevestnik—with a claimed range of 10,000–20,000 km (6,200–12,400 mi), and able to fly as low as 50 m (160 ft) above ground—had carried out a 14,000 km (8,700 mi) flight over 15 hours on 21 October 2025, with vertical and horizontal manoevring tested and found to meet specifications, demonstrating "high capabilities to bypass missile and air defence systems". The Norwegian Radiation Protection Authority did not initially detect any spike in measurements by its radioactivity monitoring stations, but Norway's military intelligence confirmed the test launch of Burevestnik on Novaya Zemlya.

=== Design speculation ===
According to Vladimir Putin and the Russian Ministry of Defense, the missile's dimensions are comparable to the Kh-101 cruise missile, but the claimed operational range is greater. It is equipped with a small-sized nuclear power unit. An official presentation shows that the missile starts from an inclined launcher using a detachable rocket booster.

Pavel Ivanov from VPK-news states that the cruise missile is one and a half to two times the size of the Kh-101, and the wings of the Burevestnik are rooted "on top of the fuselage, rather than below it like on the Kh-101." He also notes that there are "characteristic protrusions where air is most likely heated by the nuclear reactor". According to Ivanov, the mass of the Burevestnik is several times, and probably an order of magnitude [10 times] greater than that of the Kh-101, which eliminates the Tu-160 and Tu-95 aircraft as potential carriers of the missile.

According to Nezavisimaya Gazeta, Burevestnik is a nuclear thermal rocket with a solid-fueled booster engine. The length of the missile is 12 m (39 ft) at launch and 9 m (30 ft) in flight. The nose has the shape of an "ellipse 1 m (3.3 ft) × 1.5 m (4.9 ft) in size".

Military expert Anton Lavrov, in an Izvestia article, suggested that the Burevestnik uses a ramjet engine, which, unlike usual nuclear weapon propulsion systems, constantly emits radioactive exhaust.

Stratfor, an American geopolitical intelligence platform, assumes that Burevestnik utilizes a turbojet engine and a liquid-fueled booster.

According to James Hockenhull, the UK's Chief of Defence Intelligence (CDI), the Burevestnik is a "sub-sonic nuclear-powered cruise missile system which has global reach and would allow attack from unexpected directions", and would have "a near indefinite loiter time".

Director of the Federation of American Scientists's Nuclear Information Project Hans M. Kristensen points out that the Burevestnik will be as vulnerable as any cruise missile, and questions the motive behind it, since the longer it flies the more time there is to track it.

Former Los Alamos National Laboratory nuclear researcher Cheryl Rofer and former top State Department official with the Arms Control Association Thomas Countryman have both pointed out the risk of nuclear contamination to Russia itself, with Countryman calling the weapon system "uniquely stupid" and calling it a "flying Chernobyl".

According to Jake J. Hecla and R. Scott Kemp at the Massachusetts Institute of Technology, based on available open source information it is likely to use a direct-cycle air-breathing nuclear propulsion system that drives a turbojet, as an indirect loop design cannot be accommodated by the missile's size. The design allows the missile to travel at high subsonic speeds. The clean atmospheric air that passes through the reactor, gets irradiated and infused with fission decay products, releasing radioactive isotopes of argon, krypton, and carbon back to the atmosphere. Prolonged flight would also likely corrode the reactor core due to heat and compressed air, further increasing radioactive particles. According to William Alberque, a former director of strategy, technology and arms control at the International Institute for Strategic Studies (IISS) the release of radiation makes it easier to track and the reactor continuously degrading the internal components of the missile makes infinite range unlikely and that the concept was abandoned during the Cold War due to its impracticality. Hecla and Kemp assumed that Burevestnik is likely to provide technologies for more ambitious and practical projects in the future, such as nuclear-powered surveillance drones or space-based nuclear systems.

== Test locations ==
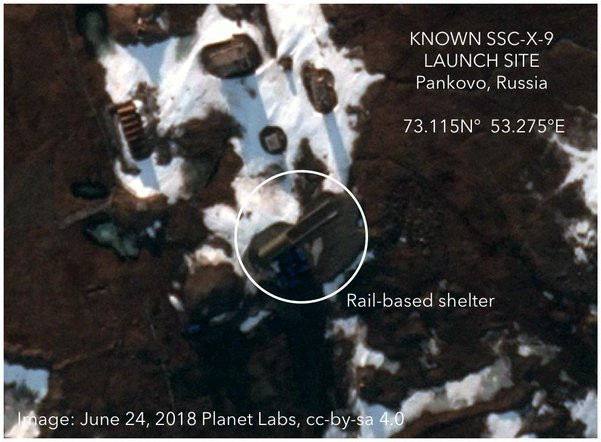
24 June 2018 Burevestnik launch site at Pan'kovo

Nuclear nonproliferation expert Jeffrey Lewis has identified some likely test locations for the Burevestnik. These locations share a rail-based environmental shelter visible on satellite imagery.

=== Pan'kovo ===
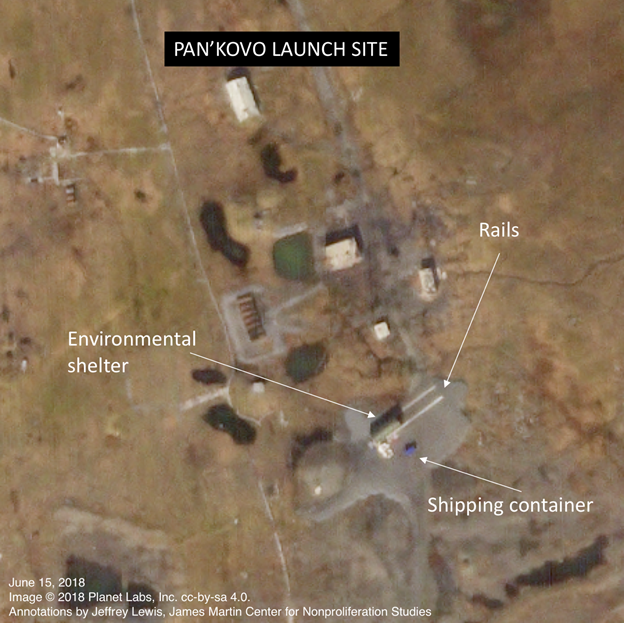
15 June 2018 satellite imagery of Pan'kovo launch site with rail-based environmental shelter

The Pan'kovo test range is located 170 km north of Rogachevo air base on Yuzhny Island of the Novaya Zemlya archipelago in the Arctic Ocean.

In November 2017 the site saw an unsuccessful test of a Burevestnik missile that after two minutes of flight that covered some 35 km crashed into the Barents Sea. Three vessels, one of which was equipped to handle radioactive material, were tasked with the recovery of debris from the missile.

Planet Labs satellite imagery from 15 and 24 June 2018 published by Lewis and MIIS show the rail-based environmental shelter at the Pan'kovo test range that is claimed by Lewis to be characteristic of a Burevestnik launch site.

Planet Labs satellite imagery from 7 August 2025 published by Lewis and MIIS was claimed by Lewis and by ICBM researcher Decker Eveleth to show test preparations of the Burevestnik at the Pan'kovo test range.

=== Nyonoksa State Central Navy Testing Range ===
The State Central Navy Testing Range is located near Nyonoksa near Severodvinsk in northern Russia.

Airbus satellite imagery from 14 May 2019 published by Lewis shows the rail-based environmental shelter associated with Burevestnik testing at the State Central Navy Testing Range.

==== Nyonoksa radiation accident ====
On 9 August 2019, the Russian nuclear energy agency Rosatom confirmed a release of radioactivity at the State Central Navy Testing Range and stated it was linked to an accident involving the test of an "isotope power source for a liquid-fuelled rocket engine". Five weapons scientists were killed in the accident. Nonproliferation expert Jeffrey Lewis and Federation of American Scientists fellow Ankit Panda suspect the incident resulted from a test of the Burevestnik cruise missile. However, other arms control experts disputed the assertions: Ian Williams of the Center for Strategic and International Studies and James Acton of the Carnegie Endowment for International Peace expressed skepticism over Moscow's financial and technical capabilities to field the weapon, while Michael Kofman of the Wilson Center concluded that the explosion was probably not related to Burevestnik but instead to the testing of another military platform.

According to CNBC, the explosion occurred during an attempt to recover a missile from the seabed, which was lost during a previously failed test. On 10 October, Thomas DiNanno, member of the United States delegation to the United Nations General Assembly First Committee, stated that the "August 8th 'Skyfall' incident [...] was the result of a nuclear reaction that occurred during the recovery of a Russian nuclear-powered cruise missile", which "remained on the bed of the White Sea since its failed test early last year".

On 26 August 2019, Aleksei Karpov, Russia's envoy to international organizations in Vienna, stated that the accident was linked to the development of weapons which Russia had to begin creating as "one of the tit-for-tat measures in the wake of the United States' withdrawal from the Anti-Ballistic Missile Treaty".

On 21 November 2019, at the ceremony of presentation of posthumous awards to the dead men's families, Vladimir Putin stated that the scientists killed in the explosion on 8 August had been testing an "unparalleled" weapon: "We are talking about the most advanced and unparalleled technical ideas and solutions about weapons design to ensure Russia's sovereignty and security for decades to come". He also noted that the "weapon is to be perfected regardless of anything".

=== Kapustin Yar ===
Lewis suggests that the Kapustin Yar rocket launch complex seems to have the same rail-based environmental shelter associated with Burevestnik testing, possibly for testing without the nuclear-power unit.

== Operators ==
- Russia (planned)

== See also ==
- Poseidon – a Russian nuclear torpedo / drone submarine, also built around a miniature nuclear propulsion unit
- Project Pluto – the US nuclear ramjet engine development program
- The Lost Missile – a 1958 fictional film focusing on a similar weapon
