= Pan'kovo test range =

Russian military test site in Novaya Zemlya

Pan'kovo
- Pan'kovo, Novaya Zemlya, Arkhangelsk Oblast in Russia
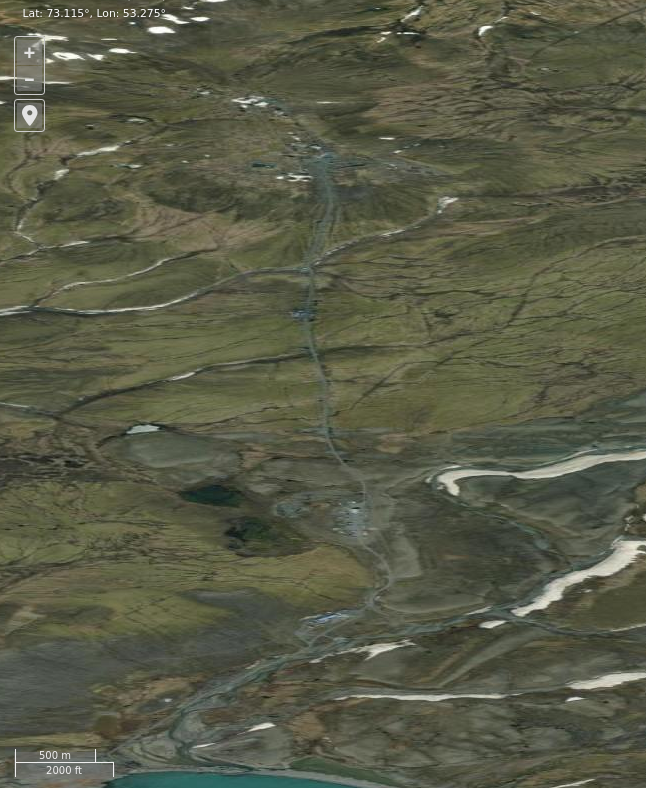
- Satellite imagery of Pan'kovo test range

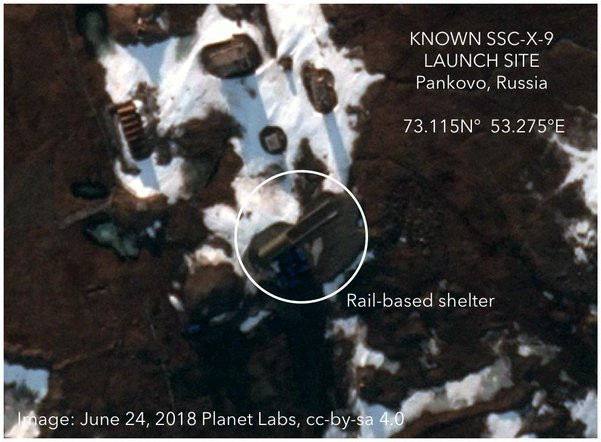
- June 2018 Pan'kovo launch site

Site information
- Operator: Russian Armed Forces

Location
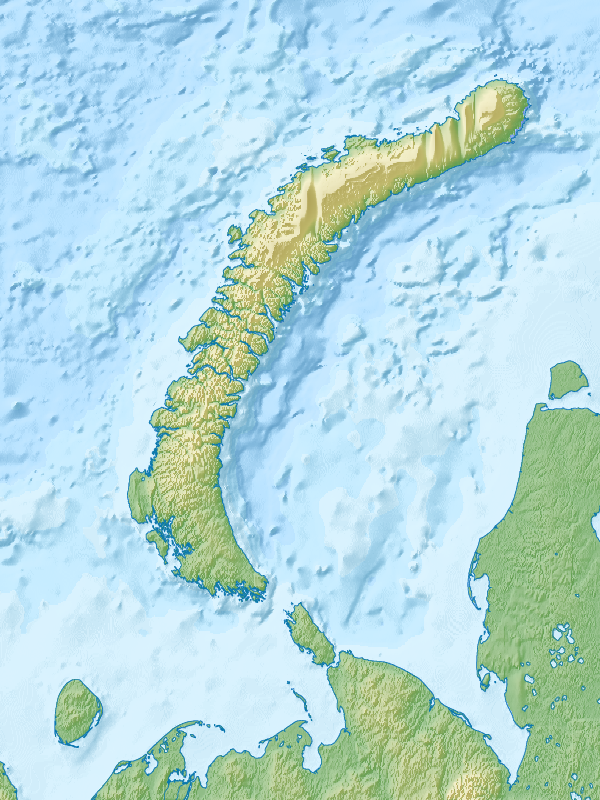
- Coordinates: 73.115°N 53.275°E

The Pan'kovo test range is a missile launch site of the Russian Armed Forces. The site is located 170 km north of Rogachevo air base on Yuzhny Island of the Novaya Zemlya archipelago in the Arctic Ocean. Personnel can arrive at the test range via helicopters from the air base.

As of July 2025 the Pan'kovo test range has no port. Instead, in recent years a floating jetty has been placed at the shore during the summer and cargo from arriving ships is brought to shore by barges. One vessel that has delivered cargo to the test site is Rosatomflot's nuclear-powered cargo ship Sevmorput that can float out lighters with containers.

== History ==
In November 2017 the site saw an unsuccessful test of a 9M730 Burevestnik nuclear-powered missile that after two minutes of flight that covered some 35 km crashed into the Barents Sea. Three vessels one of which was equipped to handle radioactive material were tasked with the recovery of debris from the missile.

Planet Labs satellite imagery from 15 and 24 June 2018 published by nuclear nonproliferation expert Jeffrey Lewis and Middlebury Institute of International Studies at Monterey (MIIS) show a rail-based environmental shelter at the Pan'kovo test range that is claimed by Lewis to be characteristic of a Burevestnik launch site.

In August 2019 Lewis claimed that the Pan'kovo test site had been closed down, with testing instead continued at the Nyonoksa State Central Navy Testing Range.

Planet Labs satellite imagery from 20 September 2018 and from 18 September 2020 published by MIIS show how the launch facility had been rebuilt with a new orientation of the rails. The reopening of the Pan'kovo test range thus followed the Nyonoksa radiation accident.

Airbus satellite imagery from 16 September 2022 was interpreted by a named military analyst to prove that a Burevestnik was present and ready for testing at the test range.

Planet Labs satellite imagery from 7 August 2025 published by Lewis and MIIS was claimed by Lewis and by ICBM researcher Decker Eveleth to show test preparations of the Burevestnik at the test range.

== See also ==
- List of Russian military bases
- State Central Navy Testing Range
