= Sopka (mound) =

Tumulus resembling a kurgan

A sopka is a monumental tumulus resembling a kurgan, referring specifically to those built by the Novgorodian sopka culture of the Early Middle Ages. The archaeological term "sopka" should not be confused with the generic Russian word "sopka" for hills and mountains of smaller elevation with rounded top and gentle slopes.

The term "sopka" was introduced by Zorian Dołęga-Chodakowski.

The Peredolian sopka is a famous example of a sopka.
