= Nyonoksa =

Nyonoksa Нёнокса
- Selo
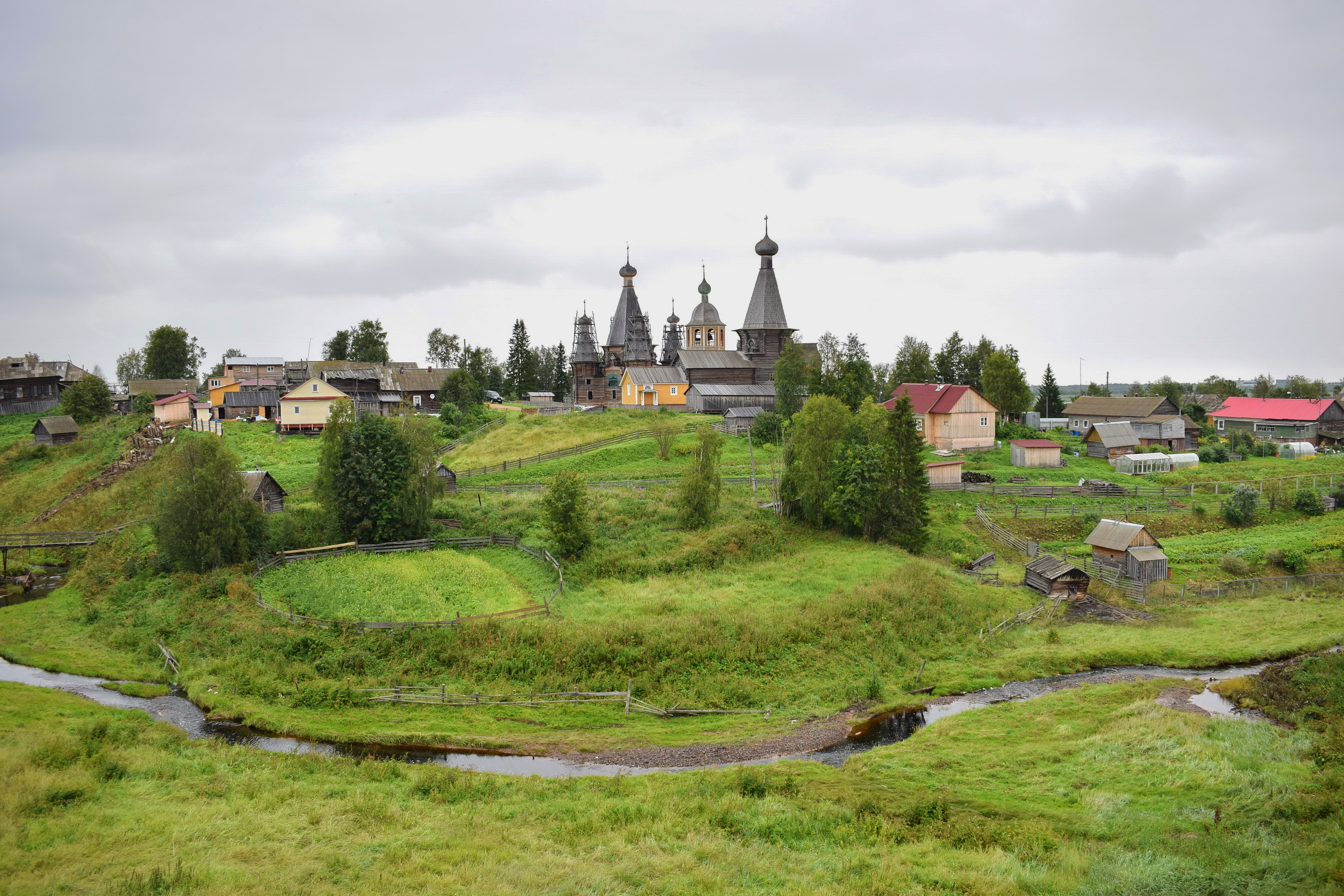
- Panorama of Nyonoksa
- Interactive map of Nyonoksa
- Location of Nyonoksa Nyonoksa (Arkhangelsk Oblast)
- Coordinates: 64°37′14″N 39°10′49″E
- Country: Russia
- Federal subject: Arkhangelsk Oblast
- Founded: 1397 (Julian)
- Elevation: 7 m (23 ft)

Population
  - Estimate (2010): 468 )

Municipal status
  - Urban okrug: Severodvinsk Urban Okrug
- Time zone: UTC+3 (MSK)
- Postal code: 164526
- OKTMO ID: 11730000126

Nyonoksa, also Nenoksa, (Russian: Нёнокса pronounced [ˈnʲɵnəksə]) is a rural locality (a selo) under the administrative jurisdiction of Severodvinsk Town of Oblast Significance, Arkhangelsk Oblast, Russia. It is located at the coast of the Dvina Bay of the White Sea (the Summer Coast) 19 miles (31 km) northwest of the city of Severodvinsk.

Nyonoksa is the site of State Central Navy Testing Range, the primary missile range of the Russian Navy and formerly the Soviet Navy. In 2019 a radiation accident at the site during testing of the 9M730 Burevestnik nuclear-powered cruise missile caused five deaths. The Nyonoksa railway station is 1.2 miles (1.9 km) from Nyonoksa at the mostly military village of Sopka along the Northern Railway line from Severodvinsk. Nyonoksa is accessible by land vehicles only during the winter months when the nearby swampland freezes.

== Missile testing site ==
Established in 1954 near Nyonoksa is "The State Central Navy Testing Range" (Russian: «Государственный центральный морской полигон») which is the main rocket launching site of the Soviet Navy and later the Russian Navy and is also called Nyonoksa. The naval missile range is also known as military unit 09703. (Note: According to a 25 February 2008 Kommersant article, the 45th State Central Testing Range at Nyonoksa is part of the 20 August 1940 established White Sea Naval Base with Commander Rear Admiral Vitaly Fedorin (Russian: контр-адмирал Виталий Федорин) the commanding officer as of February 2008 and, as of December 2012, Captain I Rank Viktor Liina (Russian: капитан I ранг Виктор Лиина; born 1968), who previously was the Deputy Commander of the Northern Fleet's submarine forces, was the commanding officer.) Since 1965 numerous rockets of the types R-27, R-29, R-39 Rif and R-39M were launched from Nyonoksa. These rockets were prototypes for the employment on missile submarines. The launching site is located in the mostly military settlement of Sopka (Russian: Сопка), which has a railroad station, hosts the military unit 09703, has a population similar to Nyonoksa of about 500, and is 2 kilometres (1.2 mi) north of the selo of Nyonoksa.

On 15 December 2015 at 11am, an accident during a missile launch test resulted in a block of flats in the mostly military village of Sopka, which is part of Nyonoksa, being hit by part of a rocket. A fire broke out, but all residents were evacuated in time.

=== 2019 explosion ===
On 8 August 2019 an explosion occurred at or near the test site killing five and injuring six (or three) people. The explosion was followed by a brief spike in radiation levels. According to Rosatom the explosion happened on a sea platform when a "liquid-propellant engine" was tested. While Russian authorities did not disclose what the power source was intended for, some Russian media as well as U.S. President Donald Trump have linked the event to the development of the nuclear-powered cruise missile 9M730 Burevestnik, also known by its NATO reporting name as the SSC-X-9 Skyfall.

== Culture and recreation ==
Nyonoksa hosts 7 objects which are protected as cultural heritage monuments at the federal level. They are grouped in two ensembles. The Nyonokotsky Pogost is one of the few surviving triple wooden church ensembles, consisting of two churches (a bigger, unheated, church used in the summer, a smaller, heated church used in the winter) and a bell-tower. The Nyonoksa churches are the St. Nicholas Church (1763) and the Trinity Church (1727). Nyonoksa was also notable for salt production. Another ensemble, the salt production complex, is neglected since the Great Patriotic War (WWII).

== History ==
Neolithic settlements from 2000 to 1000 BC at Nyonoksa - Sopka (Russian: «Нёнокса — Сопка») located 4 kilometres (2.5 mi) from Nyonoksa were excavated in 1893.

The city charter dates from 1397 under Novgorod and later Muscovy rule. The city was named Nyo from Old Scythian meaning "fast flowing river" and Oxa from Finno-Ugric tribes meaning "river" or "small stream". Another version claims that the settlement is named after a Finno-Ugric leader named Niyuksa Soake (Russian: Ниюкса Соаке).

Salt production began during the 1000s and lasted until rich sources were discovered in the Urals during the 1800s which led to Nyonoksa's salt trade ending the early 1900s.

In 1419 and 1445, Norwegian Vikings or Northmen sacked wealthy Nyonoksa.

In 1553, an English ship the Edward Bonaventure in the Hugh Willoughby expedition and captained by Richard Chancellor and Clement Adams arrived during England's search for the Northern Sea Route to China and India and thus opened Russia under Czar Ivan IV to English merchants. (Note: During the winter of 1553-4, two other ships in the expedition, the Bona Esperanza and the Bona Confidentia, were left frozen fast in the Arctic ice pack in the mouth of the Arzina River (Russian: Арзина река) east of the Pechenga Monastery and later were found with their crews frozen.) The ship's captain and crew were taken to Czar Ivan IV (Note: Ivan IV also known as Ivan the Terrible, the first Czar of all Russia, was reigning during the ship's visit.) while the ship was repaired. Following repairs Edward Bonaventure sailed for London in 1556 with the first Russian ambassador to England aboard, Osep Gregorovitch Napea, arriving in London in 1557. This began the formal diplomatic relations between England and Russia. Nyonoksa was Russia's original "window to England" (Russian: «окном в Англию»).
