= The 2020 Commission Report on the North Korean Nuclear Attacks Against the United States =

2018 speculative fiction novel by Jeffrey Lewis

2020 Commission Report on the North Korean Nuclear Attacks Against the United States
- Author: Jeffrey Lewis
- Publisher: Houghton Mifflin Harcourt
- Publication date: 2018
- ISBN: 9781328573919

The 2020 Commission Report on the North Korean Nuclear Attacks Against the United States is a speculative fiction novel by Jeffrey Lewis describing a hypothetical nuclear attack by North Korea against the United States of America, published by Mariner Books. Published in 2018, it is presented as a 2023 government report created in the aftermath of the conflict.

== Plot ==
The conflict begins unintentionally, with a North Korean Pongae-5 (KN-06) unit in Ongjin, near the Korean Demilitarized Zone shooting down a civilian Air Busan Airbus A320, which was flying off-course and without a transponder due to a brief loss of power in the cockpit, having mistaken it for a U.S. stealth aircraft. South Korean President Moon Jae-in orders a retaliatory attack on North Korea without the approval of the United States, firing six missiles at the Headquarters of the Korean People's Army Air and Anti-Air Force near Pyongyang and a residence of Kim Jong Un.

Following the missile attack, North Korea's leadership, lacking communications infrastructure, misinterprets Tweets from U.S. President Donald Trump so as to believe that a decapitation strike is in-progress. North Korea launches nuclear missiles in the hopes of staving off further U.S.-South Korean attacks, with nuclear bombs detonating over Seoul, Busan, Pyeongtaek and Daegu in South Korea and Tokyo and Yokohama in Japan. Missiles launched at Guam and Okinawa fail to reach their targets. Negotiations at the headquarters of the United Nations in New York City fail to resolve the conflict.

The United States launches a retaliatory conventional strike on North Korea, but fail to locate the vehicle-mobile intercontinental ballistic missiles in North Korea's arsenal. North Korea proceeds to launch 13 nuclear-tipped missiles at the United States. The Ground-Based Interceptors at Fort Greely fail to intercept the incoming ICBMs, which detonate over Honolulu, Hawaii, Jupiter, Florida, Arlington County, Virginia, and Manhattan, New York. President Trump evacuates from Mar-a-Lago aboard Air Force One, narrowly avoiding the nuclear explosion. Kim Jong Un subsequently commits suicide at a bunker in Myohyangsan, and Mike Pence succeeds Trump as President of the United States.

== Characters ==
American

- President Donald Trump - Trump spends most of the events of the novel at Mar-a-Lago, unintentionally sparking the conflict by causing Kim Jong-un to believe that North Korea's leadership is being targeted.
- White House Chief of Staff Jack Francis - A retired United States Marine Corps General modeled on John F. Kelly.
- National Security Advisor Keith Kellogg - In the novel, Kellogg replaced John R. Bolton as National Security Advisor.
- Secretary of Defense Jim Mattis - Mattis functionally removes consideration of the use of nuclear weapons against North Korea, and orchestrates much of the war effort against North Korea. Mattis is depicted as the sole remaining member of Trump's initial inner circle.
- United States Ambassador to the United Nations Nikki Haley - Haley leads failed negotiations with Ma Zhaoxu, the Permanent Representative of China to the United Nations, to end China's support for North Korea.

North Korean

- Kim Jong Un - The leader of North Korea. Kim misinterprets the South Korean retaliatory attack and Donald Trump's tweets as the beginning of a general war, so he launches an initial strike in the hopes of preventing further attacks on North Korea. When that fails, Kim launching his remaining nuclear arsenal. He commits suicide when U.S. and South Korean special forces attack his bunker.
- Ja Song-nam - North Korea's Permanent representative to the United Nations. During the crisis, Ja is unable to contact North Korea's leadership due to damage to the telecommunications grid. He and the rest of the North Korean Mission to the United Nations defects in Haskell, New Jersey.

South Korean

- President Moon Jae-in - Infuriated by the destruction of BX 411, Moon authorizes a limited retaliatory strike against North Korea, acting without American approval. He is subsequently killed in a nuclear explosion while traveling from the Blue House to the Central Government Complex.
- Minister of National Defense Jeong Kyeong-doo - Jeong advocates a hardline approach to North Korea following the shoot-down of a civilian airliner. He is killed in the nuclear explosion above Seoul.
- Chief Presidential Secretary Im Jong-seok - Im provides the point of view for many of the South Korean developments, having narrowly survived the nuclear attack on Seoul in the Blue House.

== Development ==
Lewis drew inspiration from John Hersey's reporting on the atomic bombing of Hiroshima when depicting the casualties of nuclear war.

== Reception ==
The book received positive reviews, with Julian Borger of The Guardian comparing it to nuclear war stories Dr. Strangelove and On the Beach. The Economist observed that "The terrifying thing about “The 2020 Commission Report” is how much of it is real". The Los Angeles Review of Books described it as "the gut punch everyone needs".
