= Nikolskaya sopka =

Mountain in Russia

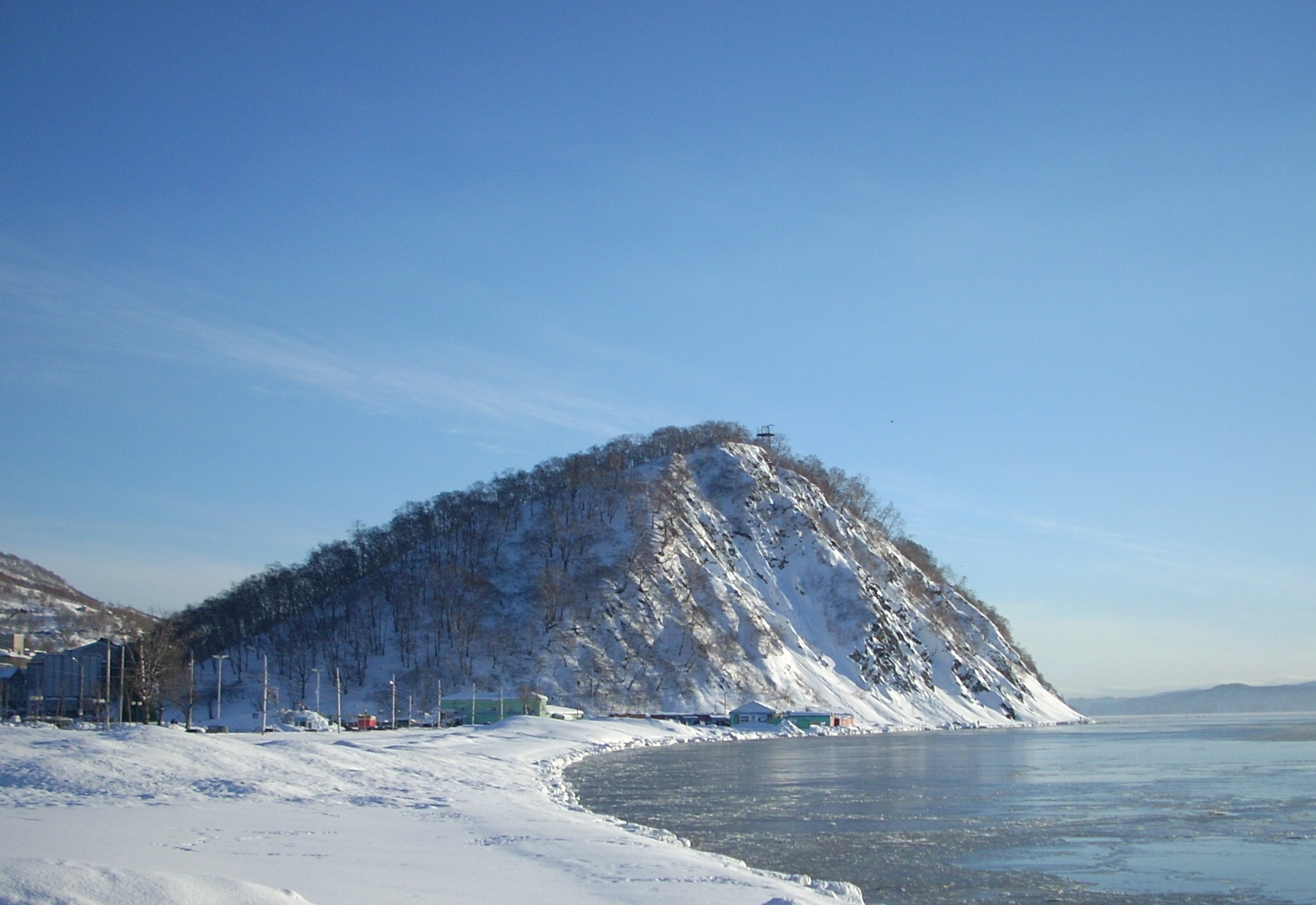

Highest point
- Elevation: 108 m (354 ft)
- Coordinates: 53°01′13″N 158°38′32″E

Geography
- Location within Kamchatka Krai Location within Russia
- Country: Russia
- Region: Kamchatka Krai
Nikolskaya sopka
- IUCN category III (natural monument or feature)
- Interactive map of Nikolskaya sopka
- Nearest city: Petropavlovsk-Kamchatsky
- Established: December 28, 1983
- Governing body: Ministry of Natural Resources and Ecology of Kamchatka Krai

Nikolskaya sopka (Russian: Нико́льская со́пка), is a sopka (hill) located in Petropavlovsk-Kamchatsky, Russia, close to the historic centre of the city. Nikolskaya sopka has a rich history, in particular, it was the site of military operations during the Siege of Petropavlovsk in 1854. A natural-historical park is located on the sopka. Nikolskaya Sopka is a natural monument. The name "The Sopka of Love" has stuck to the sopka among the people.

== General information ==
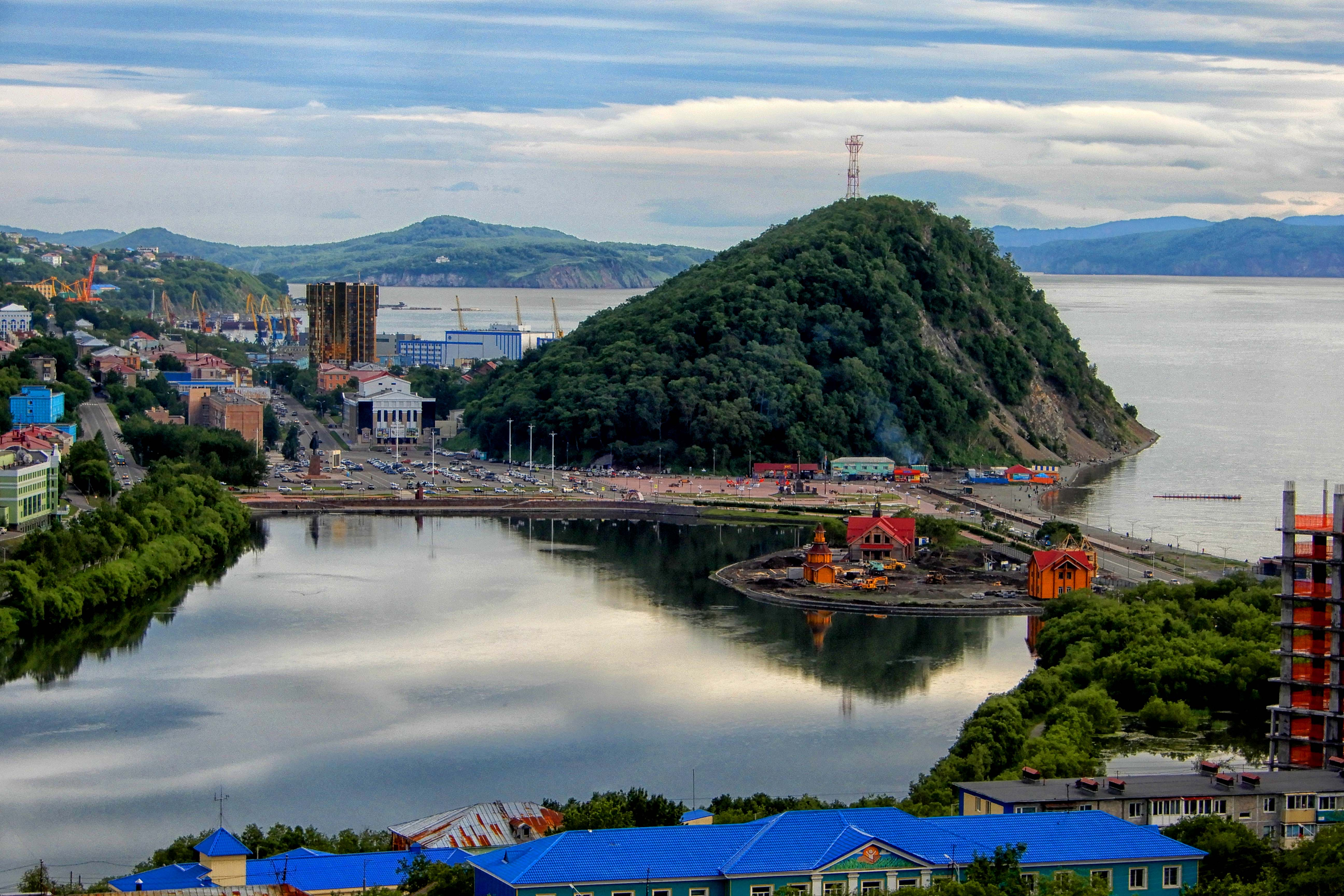
A view of Nikolskaya Sopka, Kultuchnoe Lake and Avacha Bay from Mishennaya Sopka

Nikolskaya sopka is located on the territory that is the historical centre of Petropavlovsk-Kamchatsky. The base of the second Kamchatka expedition was located on the bay shores surrounded by Nikolskaya and Petrovskaya sopkas, which marked the beginning of the city construction.

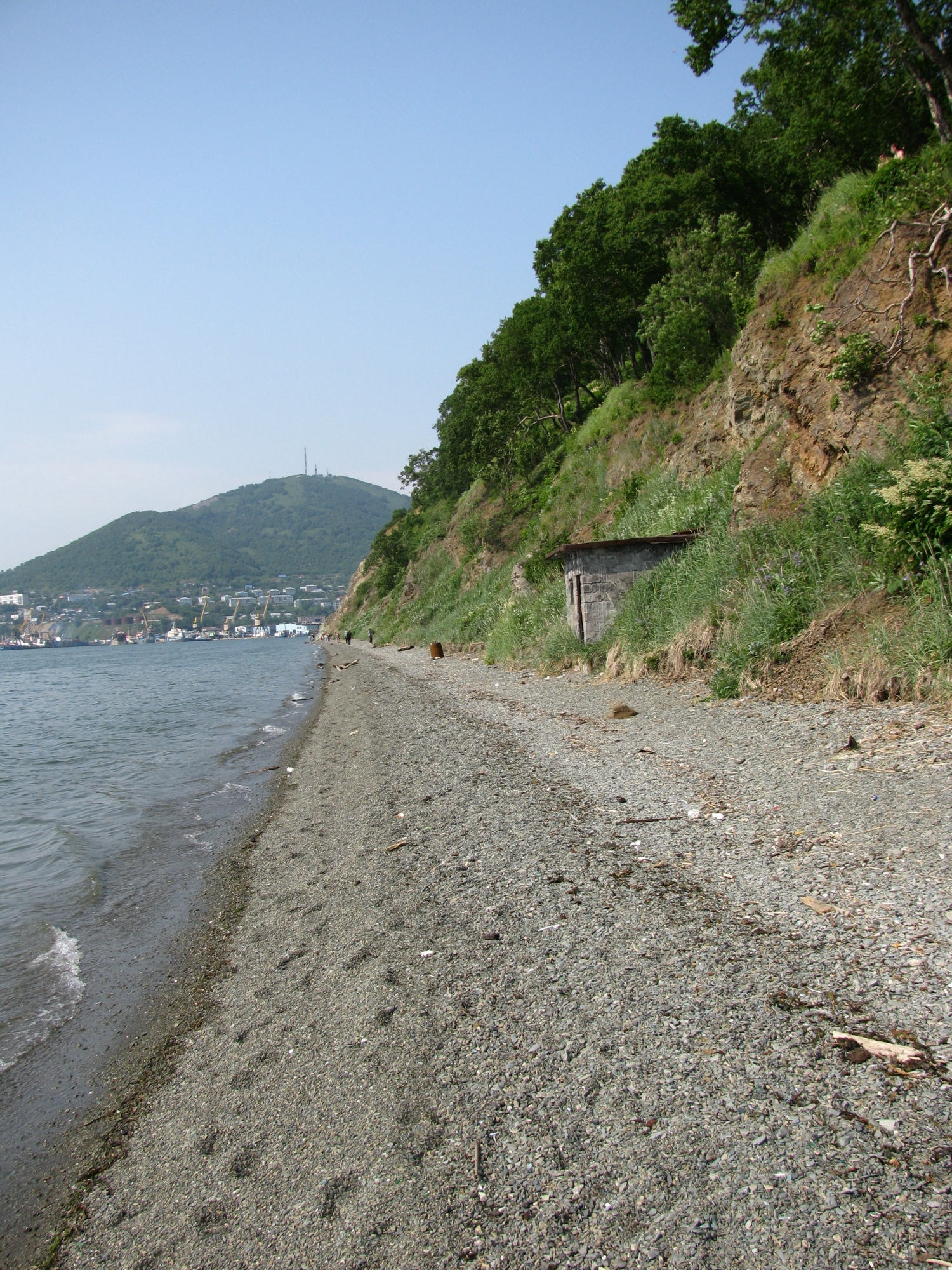
Western slopes of the sopka. The shore of Avacha Bay. Mishennaya sopka in the background

The sopka is a favourite recreation place of the townspeople. From the western side, Nikolskaya Sopka is close to Avacha Bay. On this side, there is a narrow strip of rocky beach, bounded by the steep rocky slopes of the sopka. From the central town square on the northern side of the hill, one can walk along this beach to the stairs rising to the isthmus between the hill itself and the Signal cape.

On the slopes of the sopka grows a forest of Erman's birch. According to a 1964 study, some of the trees were over 300 years old, meaning they were older than the city itself.

The sopka is popular among the population largely due to the large number of monuments erected on its slopes to commemorate the heroic defence of the city in 1854.

== Siege of Petropavlovsk during the Crimean War ==
Most of the fighting during the attack of the Anglo-French squadron on Petropavlovsk-Kamchatsky took place in the immediate vicinity and on the slopes of Nikolskaya Sopka. The city defenders had constructed artillery batteries in advance. The closest to the sopka were Battery No. 3 under the command of Alexander Maksutov and Battery No. 7 under the command of V. Koralov. The third battery was located on the isthmus between Nikolskaya sopka and Signal cape. The seventh battery was located on the northern slopes of the sopka. In the course of heavy bombardment from enemy ships, both batteries were completely destroyed, and the defenders were forced to retreat.

After the destruction of the batteries, the attackers landed a landing at the foot of Nikolskaya Sopka, the main purpose of which was to take positions on its top. The Anglo-French landing force, totalling more than 700 men, was opposed by only about 300 defenders of the city. As a result of a fierce battle, the enemy forces were completely defeated and the remnants of the landing force fled back to the ships. As a result of the battle, which lasted about two hours, Russian troops captured the banner of the Gibraltar regiment of marines and a large number of trophies.

=== Monuments to the defenders of the city ===
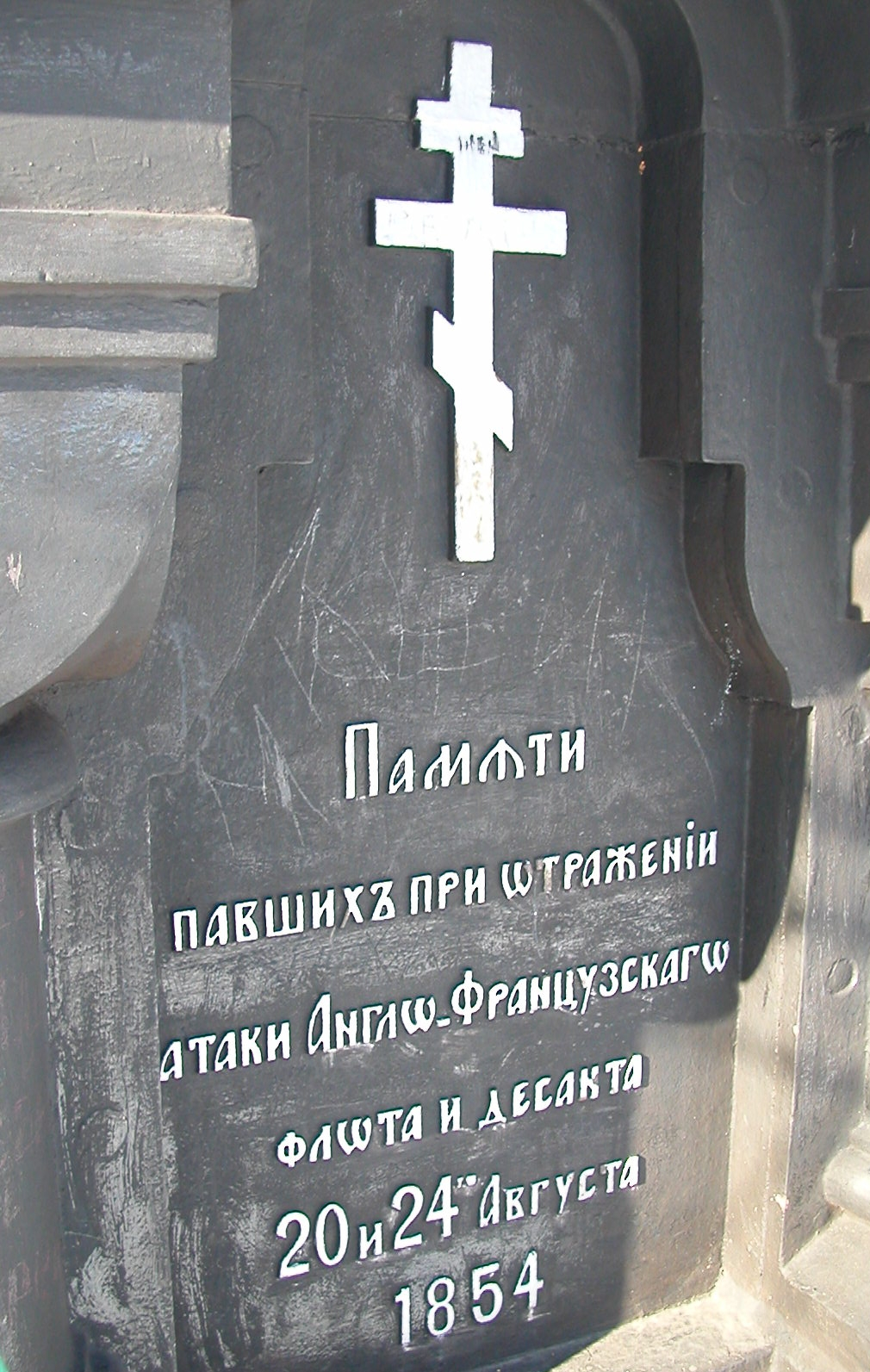
The inscription on the monument "Slava"

In honour of the defenders of Petropavlovsk, several monuments were built on the slopes of Nikolskaya sopka in different years, currently, there are only 4 monuments. The main one is a chapel built in 1912 on the eastern slope of the hill, on the site of the mass grave of soldiers who died during the defence. On the right side of the chapel are buried 35 defenders of the city, on the left - 38 British and French sailors.

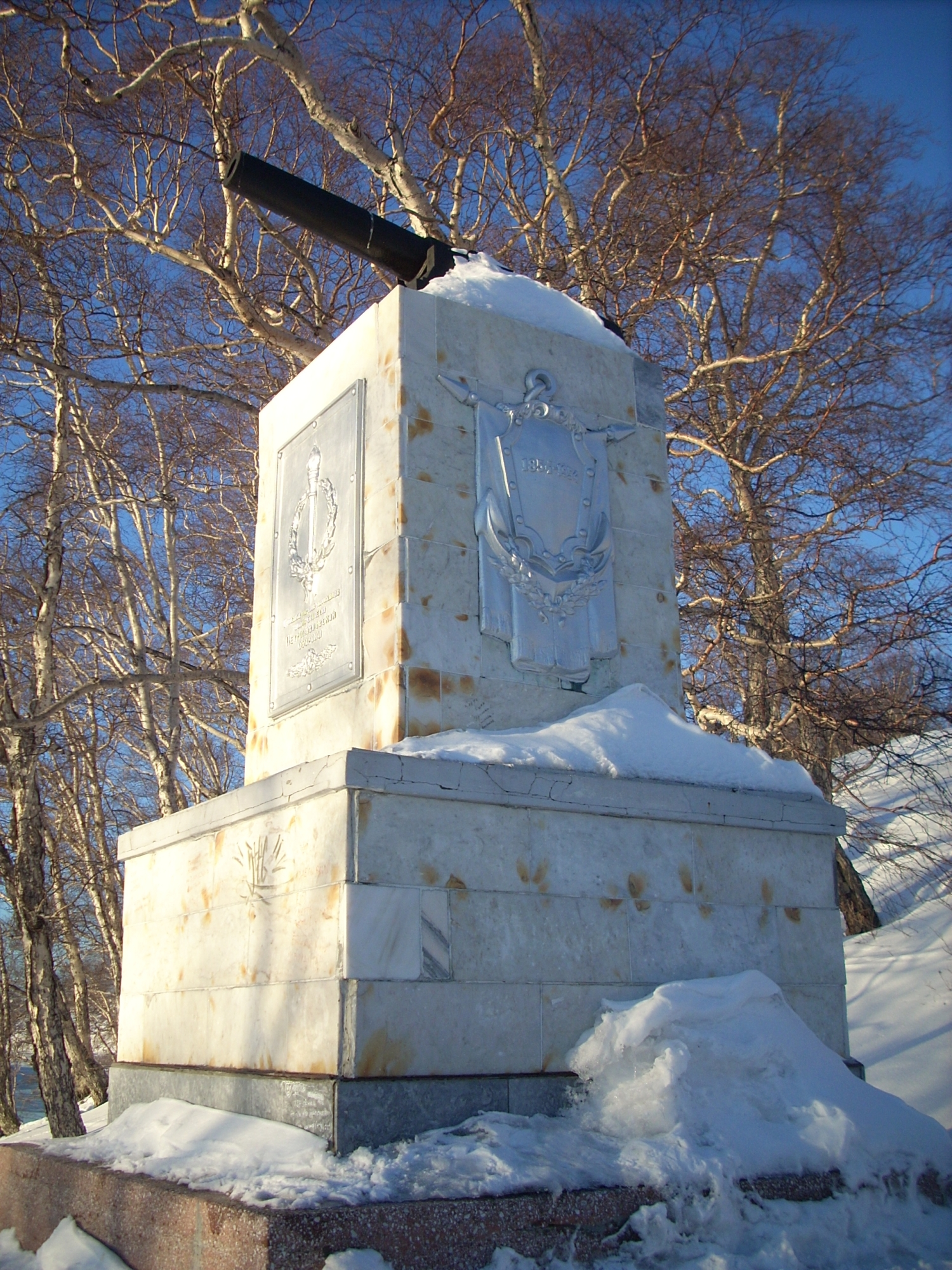
Monument commemorating the centenary of the defence

Just off the road to the top of the hillside, a metal staircase leads to the Glory monument. The monument was moved to this location in the 1940s. Previously, it was located on a sandy spit near the hillside, which is now on the territory of the seaport. The monument is a black-coloured monument with a spire topped with a patriarchal cross.

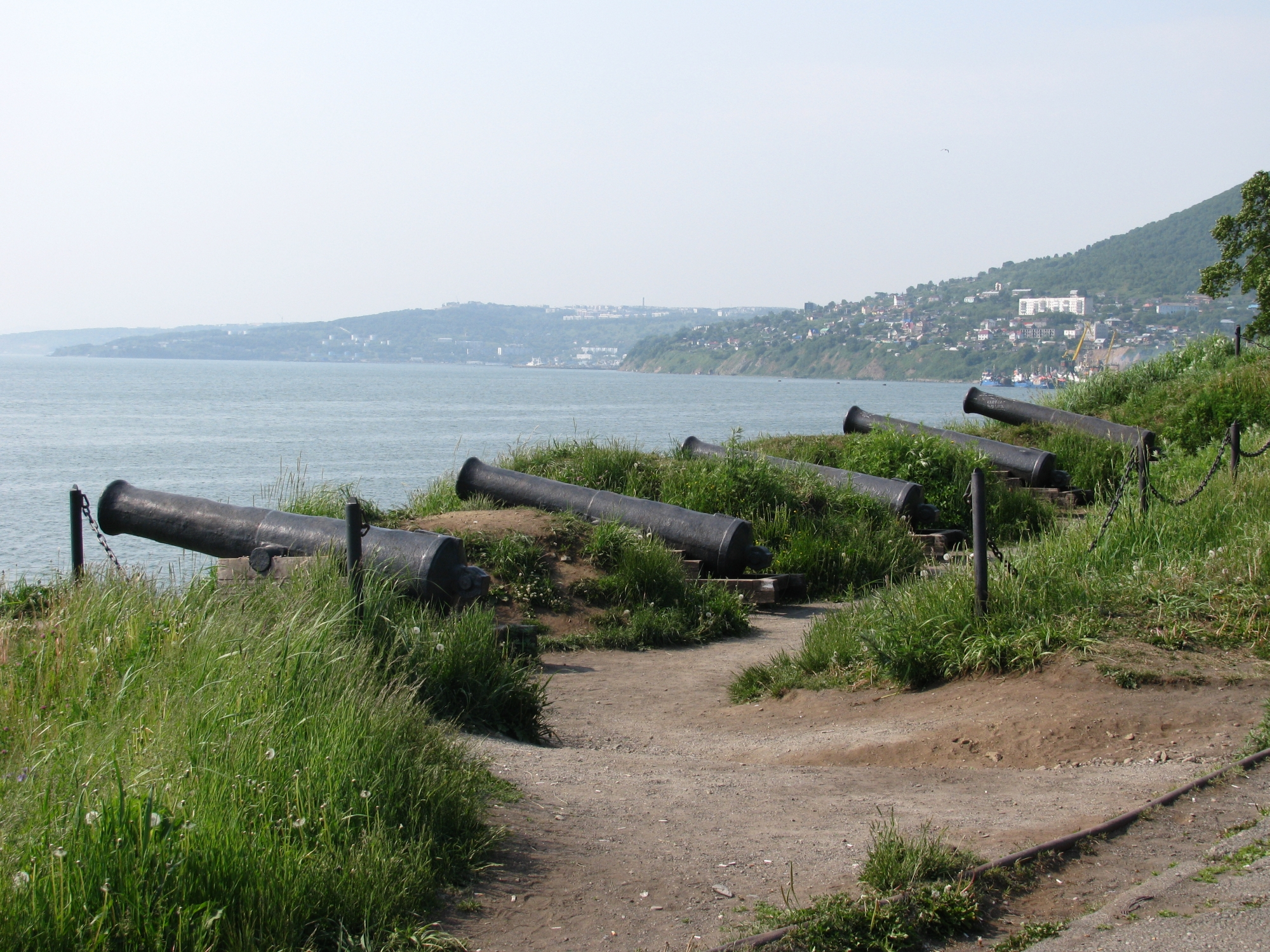
Guns at the site of Maksutov's third battery

About two hundred metres from this monument, in the direction of the isthmus, a monument was built in 1954 to commemorate the centenary of the heroic defence. The monument consists of a quadrangular base lined with light-coloured tiles. On each side there are relief metal images. A cast-iron cannon is placed on the top of the monument.

Another monument is installed on the isthmus between Signal cape and Nikolskaya sopka, where the third battery under the command of Alexander Maksutov was located. In its original version, built in 1959, it was a wooden model of a five-gun battery. In 1967 the wooden cannons were replaced by cast-iron ones.

== History of the sopka in Soviet times ==
Before the revolution, any economic and other activities on the territory of Nikolskaya Sopka were prohibited. In the 1920s Komsomol members began to improve the slopes of the hill: gradually paths for walking began to appear. In 1937 a park of culture and recreation was opened on the hill, it had such buildings as a dance floor, a summer theatre, amusement rides, a shooting gallery, a billiard room and a parachute tower. Later on, restaurants also appeared. Folk festivals were held on the territory of the park, especially on holidays such as Fisherman's Day, Navy Day.

At the top of the hill there was a vacant lot, where during the Great Patriotic War training firing was held. In the post-war years, the city's first stadium with a football field was built in its place. In autumn time it hosted the annual regional agricultural exhibition.

In the late 1960s the park of culture and recreation on the slopes of Nikolskaya Sopka lost its importance. The main place of recreation for the citizens became the town square, located on the northern side of the hill. At present, none of the buildings of the park of the Soviet period have survived, only fragments of the metal fence enclosing its territory remain on the eastern side.

In 1961, a television centre was built on the top of the hill, which operated until 2005.

In 1983, Nikolskaya Sopka was given the status of nature monument.

In 2018–2019, the park has undergone significant reconstruction and has become perhaps the most popular recreation spot for citizens and guests of the city.

== The monument to La Pérouse ==
The first monument on the slopes of Nikolskaya Sopka was a wooden monument erected in 1843 to the French navigator La Pérouse who visited Kamchatka in 1787. During the siege of Petropavlovsk, the monument was destroyed by bombardment from ships of the Anglo-French squadron. A new version of the monument to La Pérouse was built on Leninskaya Street in Petropavlovsk-Kamchatsky in 1892.

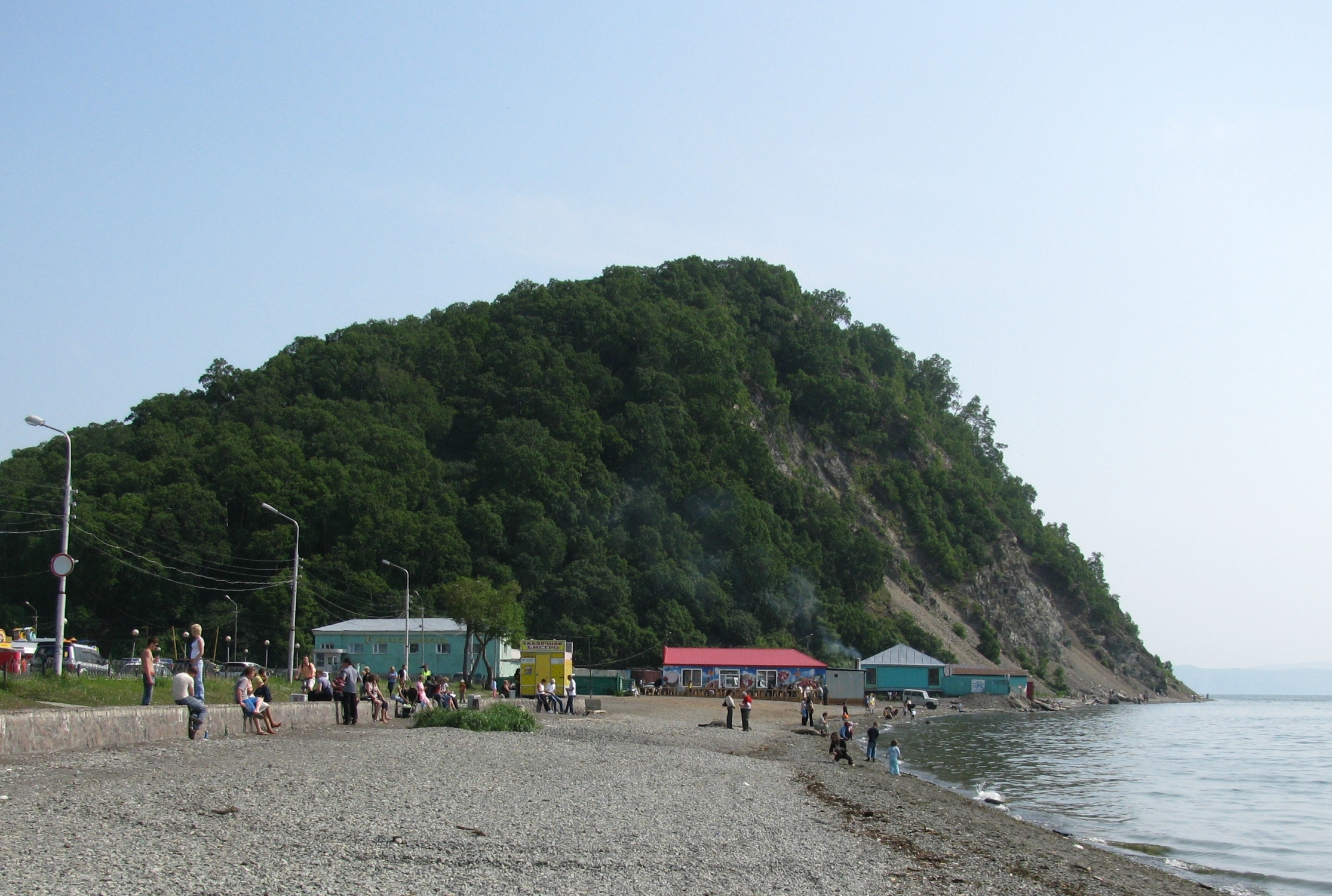
A view of Nikolskaya sopka from the central square

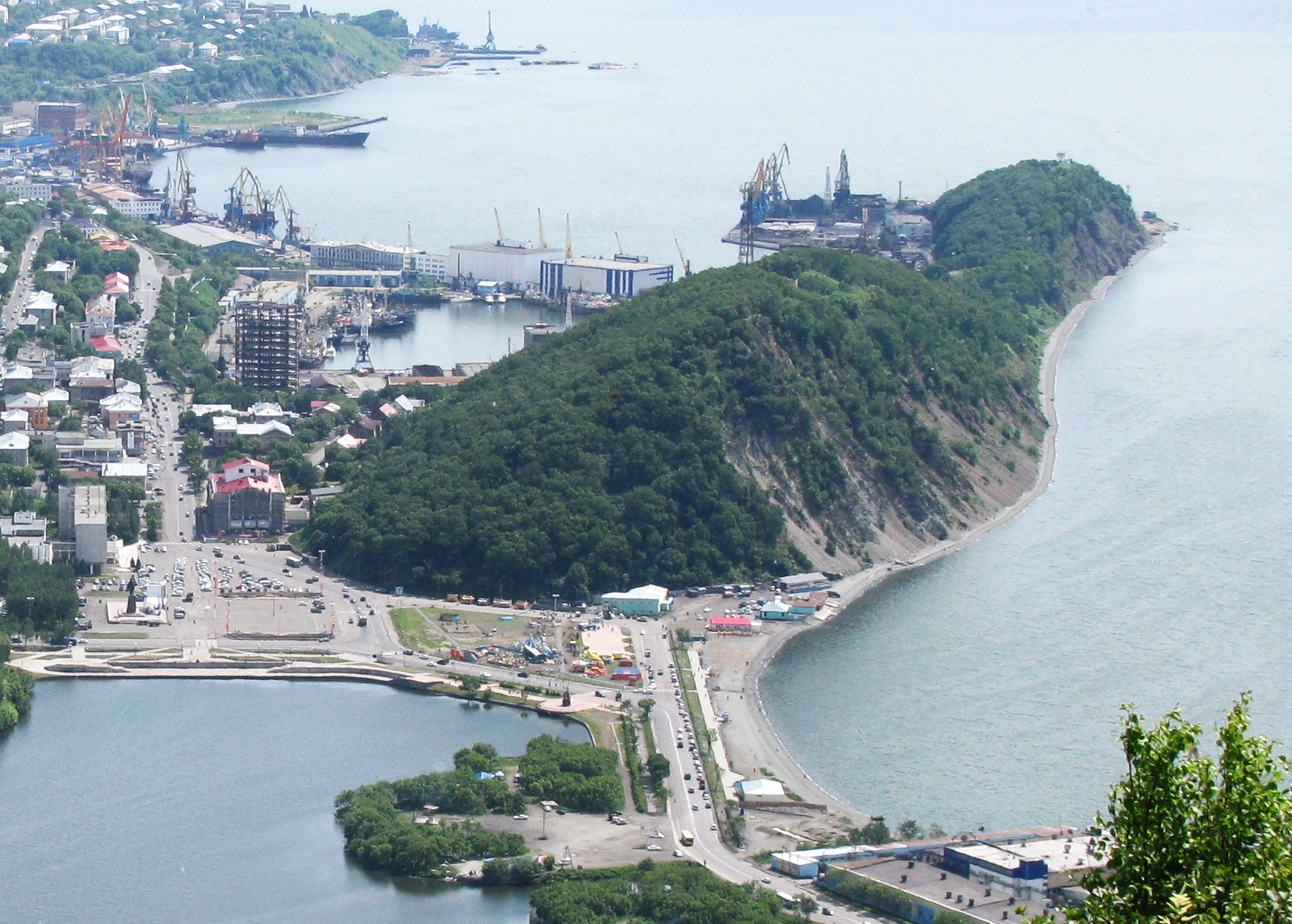
Nikolskaya sopka from the top of Mishennaya sopka

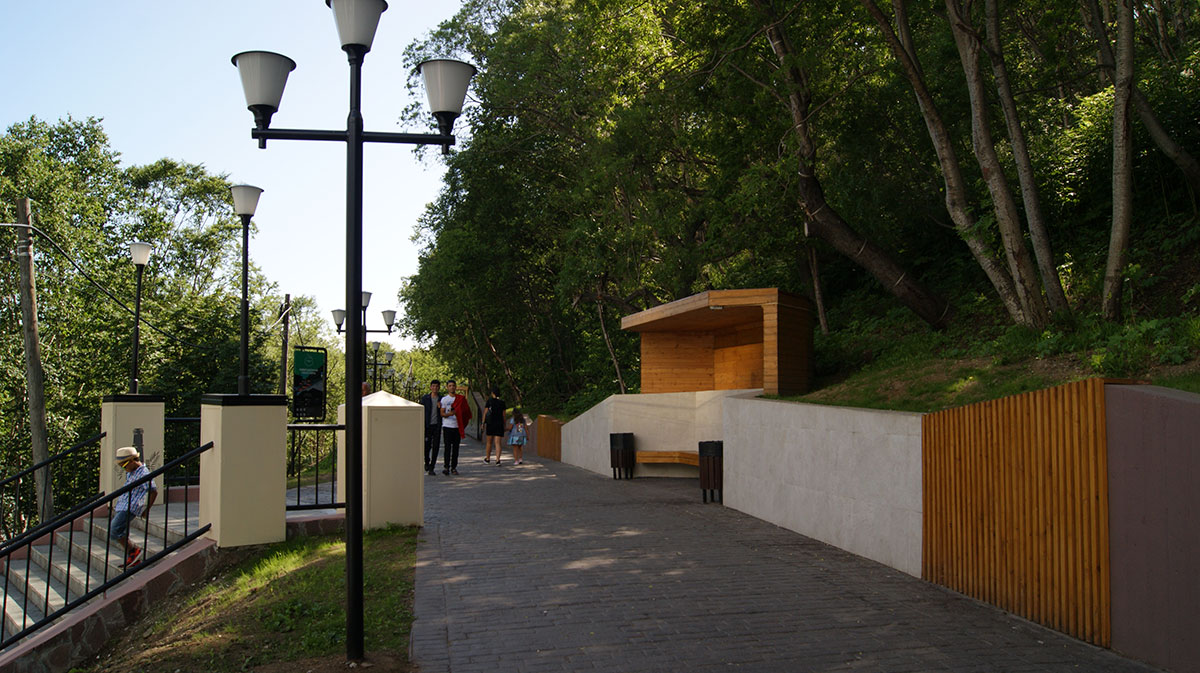
Pedestrian area on Nikolskaya sopka after reconstruction in 2018 (access from Krasintsev Street)

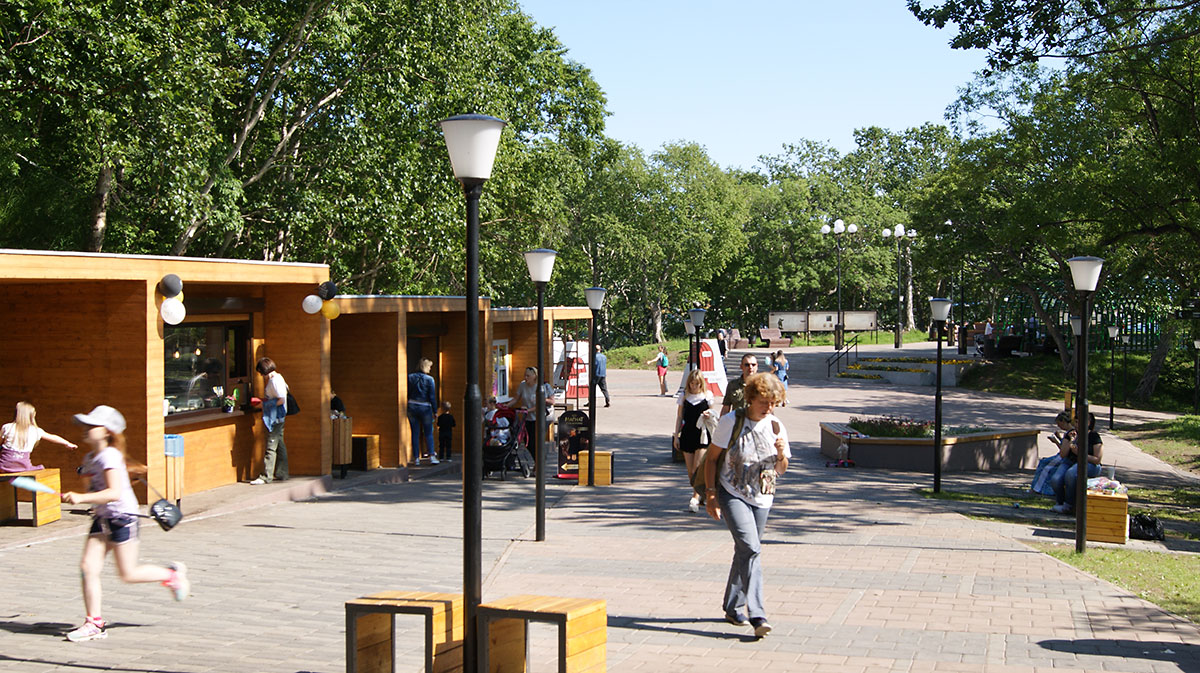
The central part of the park

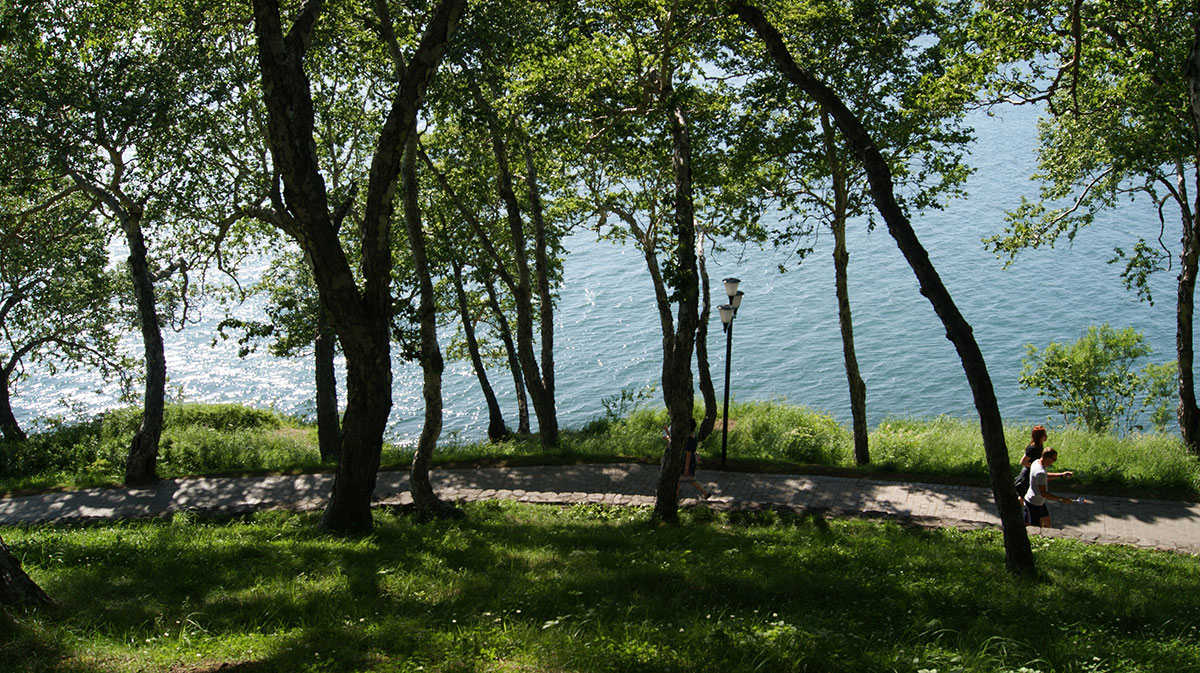
Pedestrian zone on Nikolskaya sopka (descent to the bay)

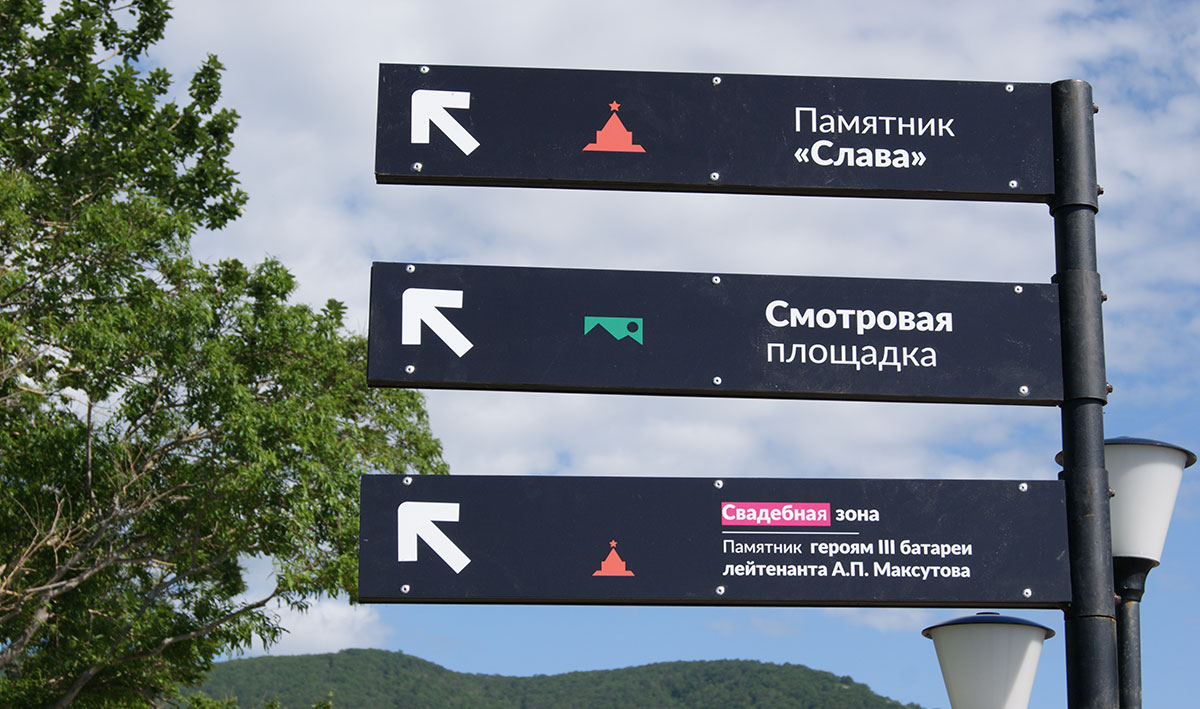
Navigation in the park

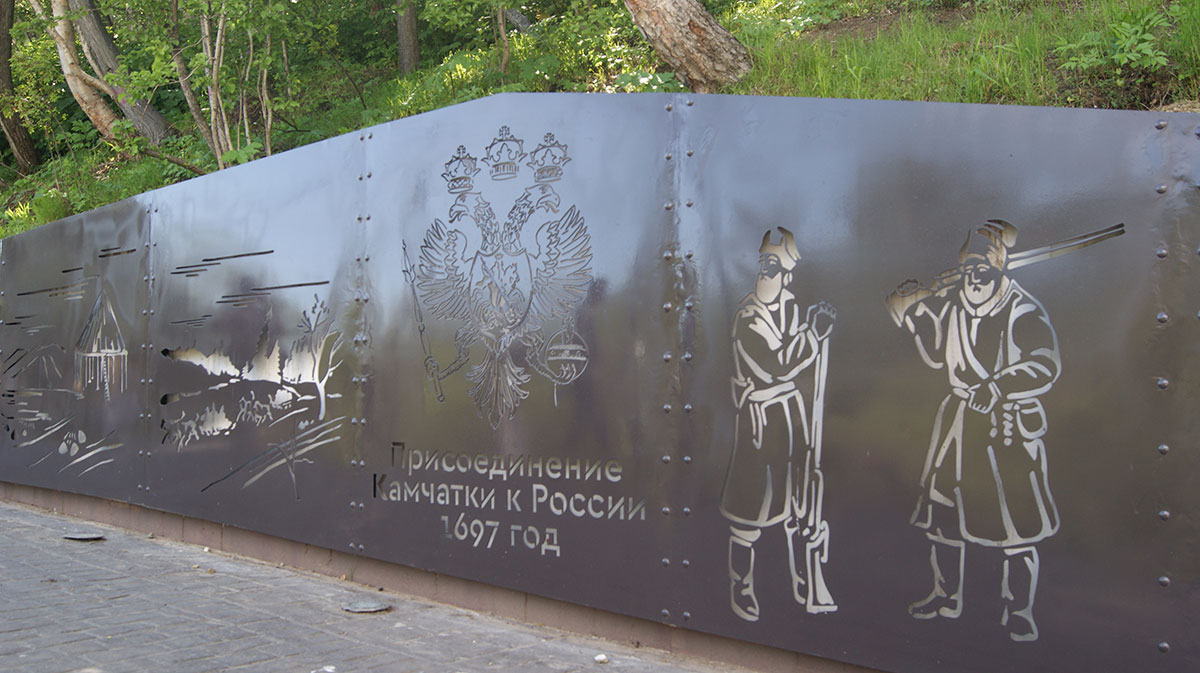
Historical bas-reliefs on Nikolskaya sopka

== See also ==
- Kamchatka Krai
- Petropavlovsk-Kamchatsky
- Siege of Petropavlovsk

== Bibliography ==
- Бооль, В. В. (2019). "Знать свое Отечество во всех его пределах..." (PDF). Petropavlovsk-Kamchatsky: Новая книга. ISBN 9785906904072. Archived from the original (PDF) on 2024-04-21.
- Девятова, Е. А. (2011-12-02). Памятник природы "Никольская сопка": история и современное состояние (PDF). Особо охраняемые природные территории Камчатского края: опыт работы, проблемы управления и перспективы развития: тез. докл. регион. науч.-практ. конф. Петропавловск-Камчатский. Archived from the original (PDF) on 2023-11-28.
- Девятова, Е.А.; Вьюнова, А.А.; Абрамова, Л.М. (2015). "Флора памятника природы "Никольская сопка" в г. Петропавловске-Камчатском". Самарский научный вестник (2(11)).
- Пирагис, А. П. (2020). Исторический путеводитель по Петропавловску-Камчатскому (PDF). Petropavlovsk-Kamtchatski: Камчатпресс. Archived from the original (PDF) on 2024-03-24.
