= Sopka, Arkhangelsk Oblast =

Sopka Сопка
- Settlement
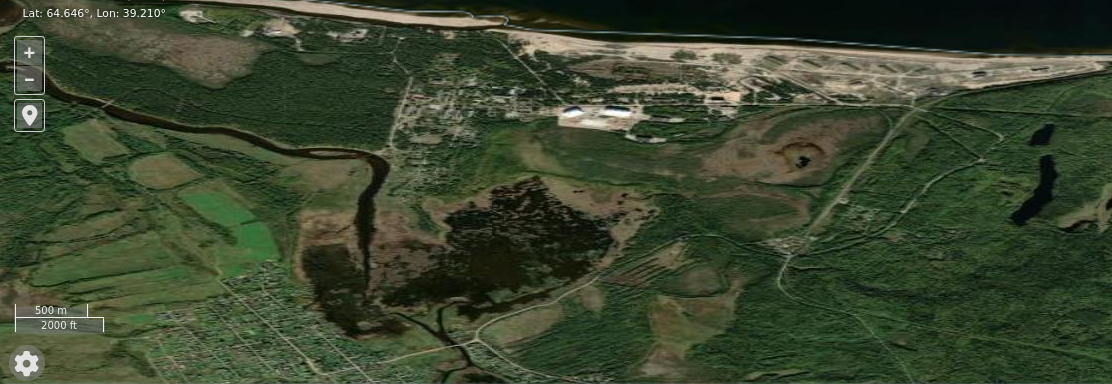
- Satellite imagery of Sopka and the test range

- Location within Arkhangelsk Oblast Location within Russia
- Coordinates: 64°38′N 39°12′E
- Country: Russia
- Region: Arkhangelsk Oblast
- District: Severodvinsk Urban okrug
- Time zone: UTC+3:00

Sopka (Russian: Со́пка) is a rural locality (a settlement) in Severodvinsk Urban Okrug, Arkhangelsk Oblast, Russia. The population was 510 as of 2010. The settlement is located west of the State Central Navy Testing Range 2 kilometres (1.2 mi) north of Nyonoksa.
