= Decker Eveleth =

American ballistic missile imagery analyst

- Occupations: Research analyst, open source intelligence analyst

Academic background
- Education: Reed College (BA); Middlebury Institute of International Studies (MA)

Academic work
- Discipline: Imagery analysis and Open-source intelligence
- Institutions: James Martin Center for Nonproliferation Studies (CNS) at Middlebury Institute of International Studies at Monterey
- Notable works: Identification of 119 ICBM silos under construction in China; Identification of 9M730 Burevestnik deployment site in Russia

Decker Eveleth is an associate research analyst at the CNA Corporation who specializes in utilizing satellite imagery and mixed methods to assess ballistic and cruise missile forces in the Middle East and Asia. His work on tracking ballistic missiles has been featured in the Washington Post, The Economist and Foreign Policy. Eveleth received international attention in 2021 for identifying the construction of 119 nuclear ICBM silos under construction in China. In 2024, he was able to identify the probable deployment site of Russia's nuclear-powered 9M730 Burevestnik cruise missile.

== Education and academic work ==
Eveleth received a BA from Reed College and an MA from the Middlebury Institute of International Studies. He is a recipient of the National Science Foundation’s Graduate Research Fellowship and has written for the United Nations Institute for Disarmament Research. Eveleth served as a graduate research assistant at the James Martin Center for Nonproliferation Studies working on the open-source intelligence team. He has been a guest speaker for the Nuclear Policy Working Group at Berkeley.

== Research ==
=== China ===
Eveleth's work has focused on tracking the growth of China's nuclear arsenal. In 2020, Eveleth and other researchers created an open-source map showing the location of each Chinese missile brigade and the type of missile assigned to it. Eveleth used a combination of open source intelligence methods and satellite imagery analysis to build the database of missile deployments, which identified at least 600 ballistic and cruise missile armed launchers operated by the People's Liberation Army Rocket Force. His research highlighted the growing threat that many of China’s new missiles are dual-capable (meaning they can be armed with either nuclear or conventional high-explosive warheads). This work would later be expanded into a 2023 report outlining the PLA Rocket Force complete order of battle.

==== ICBM silo construction discovery ====
In June 2021, Eveleth's tracking of solid-fueled nuclear missile silos in China resulted in the identification of 119 new ICBM silos intended for nuclear missiles under construction near Yumen, China, and was featured on the front page of the Washington Post. Eveleth reviewed commercial satellite imagery from Planet Labs, utilizing the fact that Planet frequently updates their public photo database, to track the timing of silo construction. Eveleth identified that building began in March 2020, with most construction occurring after February 2021, and concluded that the silos were likely meant for the DF-41 ICBM, which can reach the U.S. mainland. According to non-proliferation expert Jeffrey Lewis, "given the relatively small footprint of high-resolution satellite images (30 square miles), it would have been impossible to detect and characterize this facility without high-cadence, wide-area imagery of the kind provided by Planet’s constellation of Dove satellites. The near-daily imaging at 3 m provided enough coverage to characterize the entire 700 square mile site at a resolution sufficient to identify the construction shelters."

According to the Arms Control Association, Eveleth's work "has prompted a public debate about how the United States and China can avoid an arms race driven by mutual concerns about vulnerability to nuclear attack." As a result of the discovery, Eveleth was nominated for the Arms Control Person of the Year Award, which he lost to Foreign Minister Marcelo Ebrard and the Government of Mexico. Eveleth's discovery also earned him a feature in Bloomberg's "50: The People and Ideas That Defined Global Business in 2021". The analysis prompted condemnation from Hu Xijin, former editor-in-chief and Chinese Communist Party Committee Secretary of the Global Times.

=== Middle East ===
In October 2024, following the Iranian ballistic missile attacks on Israel, Eveleth analyzed satellite imagery of Nevatim Air Base, identifying 32 impact points. Subsequent analysis from Eveleth further identified the expected circular error probability (CEP) of Iran's missiles to be poor, between 700-1000m, making them unsuitable for use against hardened aircraft shelters like those used to protect Israel's F-35 fleet (a presumed target of the attack).

Following Israel's retaliatory airstrikes, Eveleth and former UN weapons inspector David Albright independently assessed that Israel struck facilities at the Parchin military complex and the Khojir missile production site. Again utilizing Planet Labs satellite imagery, Eveleth identified the destruction of three ballistic missile solid fuel mixing buildings and a warehouse at Parchin, as well as two hits on similar fuel mixing facilities at Khojir. Eveleth noted that the solid-fuel mixers Israel claimed to have been targeting are difficult to make, and export controlled, and thus very expensive to produce and replace; and that as a result, Israel may have "significantly hampered Iran's ability to mass produce missiles".

=== North Korea ===
Eveleth was part of a group of arms control analysts and academics from the Middlebury Institute, who roundly criticized MIT professor Theodore Postol's findings regarding the similarities between the North Korean Hwasong-18 and Russian RT-2PM2 Topol-M intercontinental ballistic missiles.

=== Russia ===
In 2024, Eveleth identified the probable deployment site of Russia's nuclear-powered 9M730 Burevestnik ("Skyfall") cruise missile at the Vologda-20 nuclear storage facility. Eveleth assessed that the site contains nine fixed launch positions located in three groups inside high berms to shield them from attack or accidental damage, linked by roads to missile-handling facilities, and to five nuclear warhead storage bunkers all present at the same site, indicating that the site was used for "a large, fixed missile system" to be maintained on alert status; and that the only large, fixed missile system that Russia is currently developing was the Skyfall.

== Publications ==
- How North Korea’s Tactical Missile Deployment Aggravates Risks of Nuclear Use, NK News (August, 2024)
- People's Liberation Army Rocket Force Order of Battle 2023, James Martin Center for Nonproliferation Studies, Middlebury Institute of International Studies at Monterrey (July 2023)
- Errors in Postol’s Analysis of the Hwasong-18, (with Daniel Allen, Madeline Berzak, Michael Duitsman, John Ford, Sam Lair, Jeffrey Lewis, and Tricia White), Arms Control Wonk (August 2023)
- China’s Growing Missile Arsenal and the Risk of a “Taiwan Missile Crisis“ (with David Joël La Boon and Jeffrey Lewis), Nuclear Threat Initiative (November 2020)
- Worse than Nothing: Strategic Ballistic Missile Defense and Great Power Deterrence, University of Washington Undergraduate Research Symposium (May 2018)

=== Blogs and online journals ===
Eveleth is the author of the Hors d'Oeuvers of Battle blog, where he publishes independent analysis. He additionally contributes to Foreign Policy, and to NK News and is a frequent collaborator with non-proliferation expert Jeffrey Lewis on the Arms Control Wonk blog and podcast.
