= State Central Navy Testing Range =

Rocket launching site

- Near Nyonoksa in Russia
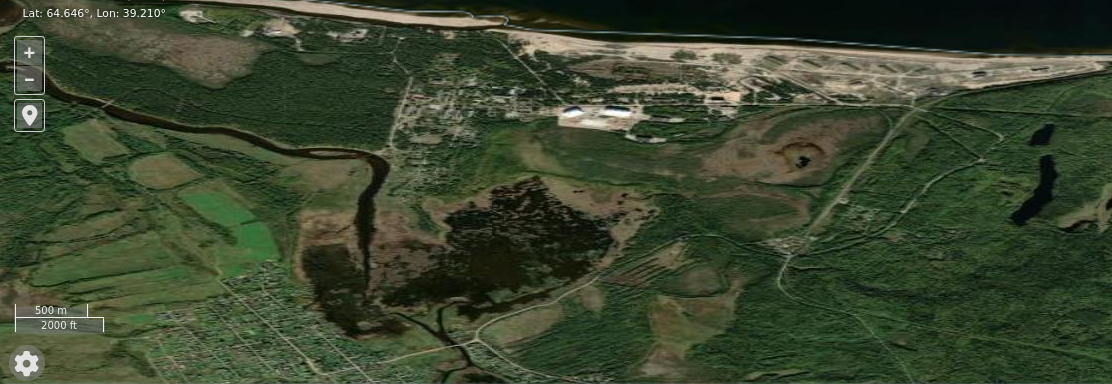
- Satellite imagery of the State Central Navy Testing Range

Site information
- Operator: Russian Navy

Location
- Coordinates: 64°38′44.848″N 39°12′34.265″E

The State Central Navy Testing Range (Russian: «Государственный центральный морской полигон», Gosudarstvennyj central'nyj morskoj poligon) at Nyonoksa is the main rocket launching site of the Soviet Navy and later the Russian Navy. The site is located east of the settlement of Sopka 2 kilometres (1.2 mi) north of Nyonoksa.

== History ==
The naval missile range was established in 1954 and is also known as military unit 09703.

Since 1965, numerous rockets of the types R-27, R-29, R-39 Rif, and R-39M were launched from Nyonoksa.

== Accidents ==
On 15 December 2015, an accident during a missile launch test resulted in a block of flats in the village being hit by part of a rocket.

On 8 August 2019, an explosion caused the Nyonoksa radiation accident with several scientists being killed. The incident might be linked to the development of the nuclear-powered cruise missile 9M730 Burevestnik, also known by its NATO reporting name as the SSC-X-9 Skyfall.

== See also ==
- List of Russian military bases
- Pan'kovo test range
