= James M. Acton =

British academic and scientist

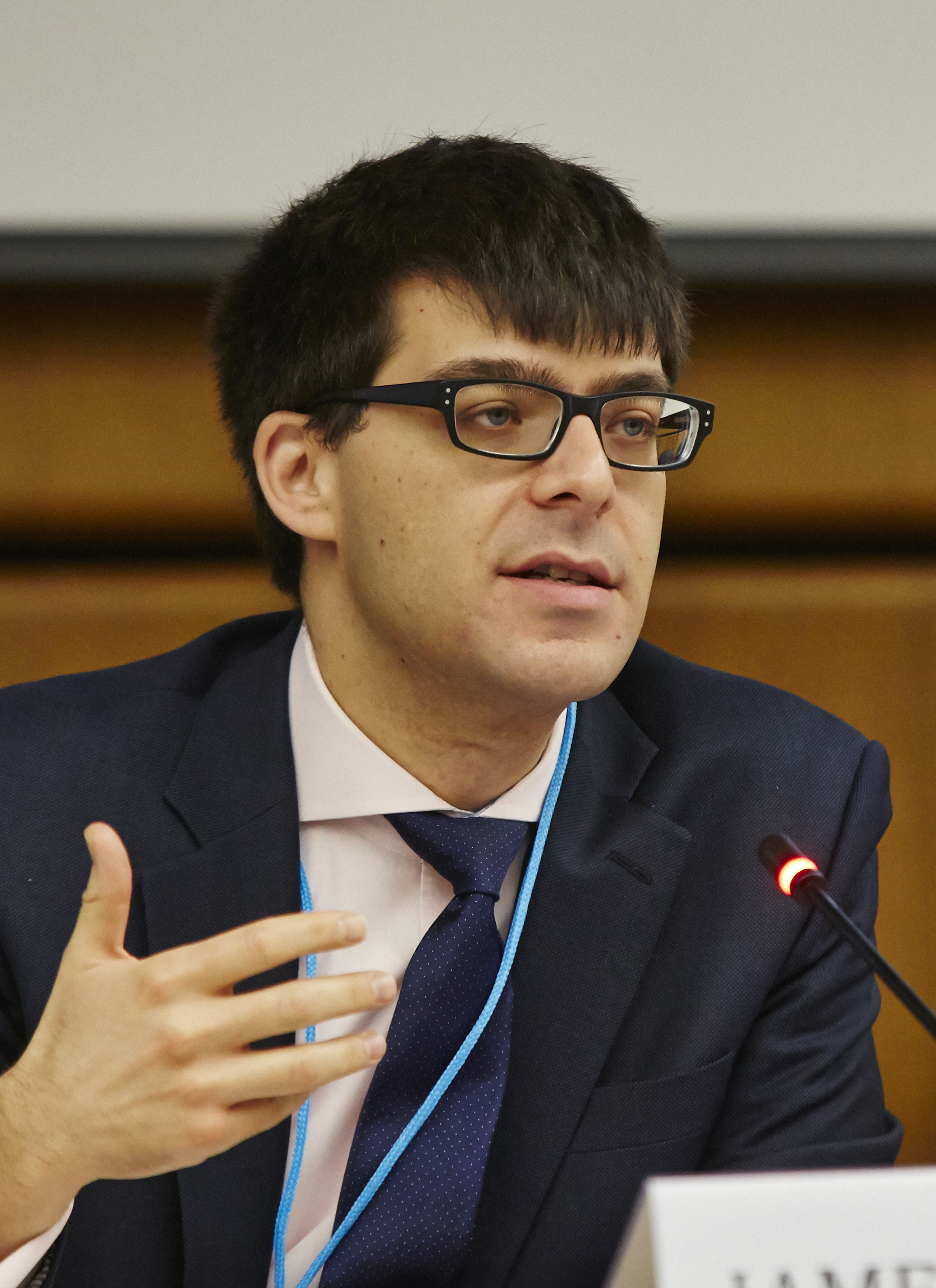
James M. Acton

James M. Acton is a British academic and scientist. He is co-director of the Nuclear Policy Program at the Carnegie Endowment for International Peace.

== Early life ==
Acton was awarded his PhD in theoretical physics at Cambridge University.

== Political views ==
In July 2024 signed an open letter against inviting Ukraine into NATO.

== Career ==
Acton was a member of the faculty of the Department of War Studies at King's College London.

Acton's research projects have included analyses of International Atomic Energy Agency safeguards in Iran, verifying disarmament in North Korea and preventing novel forms of radiological terrorism.

=== Fukushima ===
In the context of the Fukushima I nuclear accidents, Acton was able to distill a succinct analysis which was widely reported.

- "Fukushima is not the worst nuclear accident ever but it is the most complicated and the most dramatic...This was a crisis that played out in real time on TV. Chernobyl did not."
- "The key question is whether we have correctly predicted the risk that a reactor could be hit by a disaster (natural or man-made) that is bigger than it is designed to withstand."

== Selected works ==
In a statistical overview derived from writings by and about James Acton, OCLC/WorldCat encompasses roughly 7 works in 10+ publications in 1 language and 268 library holdings.

- The Use of Voluntary Safeguards to Build Trust in States' Nuclear Programmes: the Case of Iran (2007)
- Beyond the Dirty Bomb: Re-thinking Radiological Terror (2007)
- Abolishing Nuclear Weapons (2008), with George Perkovich
- Abolishing Nuclear Weapons: A Debate (2009), with George Perkovich
- Deterrence During Disarmament: Deep Nuclear Reductions and International Security, and Low Numbers: A Practical Path to Deep Nuclear Reductions (2011)
