= Michael Kofman =

American military analyst

- Михаил Кофман
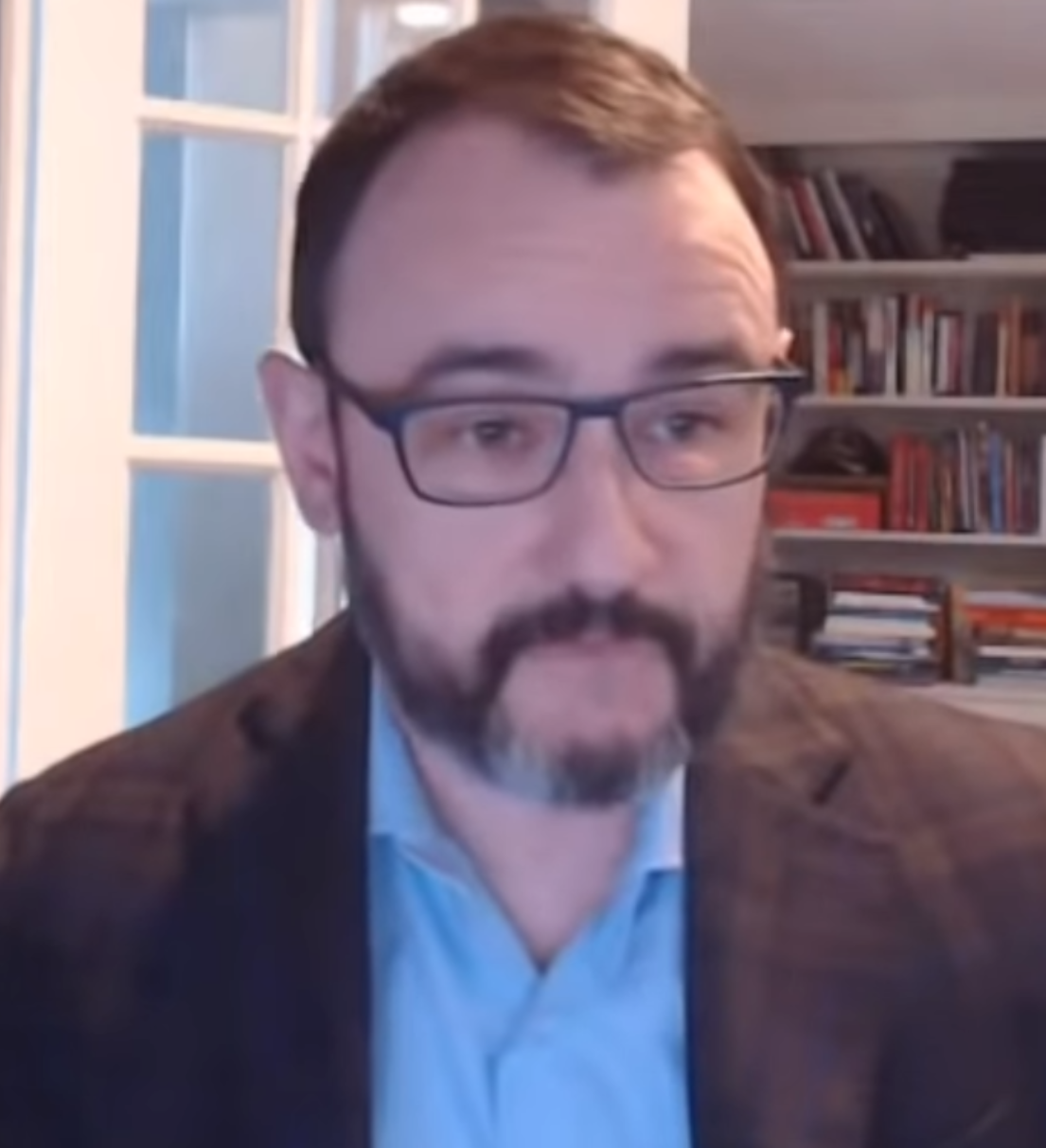
- Kofman in 2022
- Born: Mikhail Kofman; Kyiv, Ukrainian SSR, Soviet Union (now Kyiv, Ukraine)
- Occupation: Military analyst

Michael Kofman (Note: Russian: Михаил Кофман, romanized: Mikhail Kofman) is a Ukrainian-American military analyst known for his expertise on the Russian Armed Forces.

He is the former director of the Russia Studies Program at CNA, a senior fellow in the Russia and Eurasia Program at the Carnegie Endowment for International Peace, fellow of the Center for a New American Security, and until 2021 was a fellow of the Kennan Institute at the Wilson Center.

== Personal life and education ==
Kofman was born in Kyiv, Ukrainian SSR, Soviet Union (now Kyiv, Ukraine), and lived in Nikolaev (now Mykolaiv) before emigrating to the U.S. in early 1991, prior to Ukrainian independence and the collapse of the Soviet Union. Kofman speaks fluent Russian and English. He attained a Bachelor of Arts degree in political science at Northeastern University, and a Master of Arts degree in international security at the Edmund A. Walsh School of Foreign Service at Georgetown University. He lives in Alexandria, Virginia.

== Career ==
From 2005 to 2006, Kofman was a researcher at the United States Institute of Peace. From 2008 to 2014, he was a research fellow at the National Defense University. He served as a program manager and subject matter expert, advising U.S. government and military officials on matters related to Russia and Eurasia. From 2014 to 2021, he was a fellow of the Kennan Institute at the Woodrow Wilson International Center for Scholars, a U.S. think tank dedicated to the study of Russia and other post-Soviet states.

In 2015, Kofman joined the CNA Corporation as a research scientist. His research focused on Russia and the former Soviet Union, and he specializes in the Russian Armed Forces, Russian military thought, capabilities, and strategy. As of 2020, he serves as the Research Program Director of the CNA's Russia Studies Program. He was also a fellow at the Modern War Institute from 2017 to 2018, and has been a senior adjunct fellow at the Center for a New American Security since 2021. Kofman also hosts The Russia Contingency on War on the Rocks, which is a bi-weekly podcast analyzing the Russian military and the ongoing war in Ukraine.

During the Russian invasion of Ukraine that started in 2022, as CNA's expert studying Russia's armed forces, Kofman's political commentary has been cited in connection with the conflict. In an interview with The New Yorker, Kofman said that the Russian military was "deeply optimistic about their ability to quickly get into the capital and force Zelensky to either flee or surrender. So the initial operation is a complete debacle. It was based entirely on political assumptions in Moscow that basically nothing had changed in Ukraine since 2014, and that they could conduct a slightly larger version of the 2014 operation." He has said that the Russian military was "not built for this war. In terms of manpower, readiness, and logistics, it was not designed to sustain strategic ground offensives or hold large tracts of terrain, especially in a country the size of Ukraine." Speaking at an event hosted by RUSI, Kofman said that while the logistics problems with the Russian military's offensive are "oversold", that they will nevertheless become "extremely hard to undo ... militaries often have to learn problems the hard way."
