= Sopka (hill) =

Type of hill, mountain, or volcano

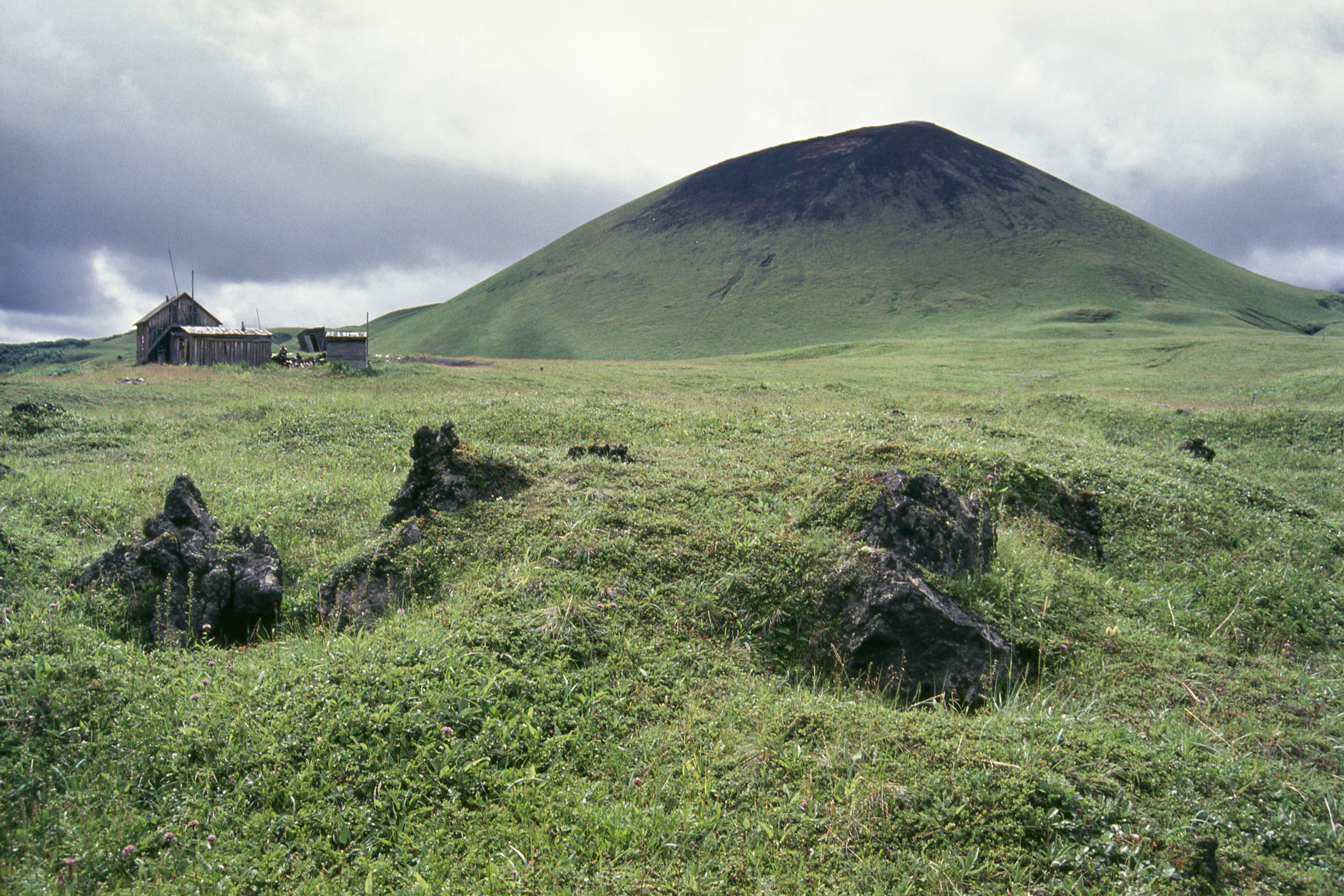
A sopka in Kamchatka

Sopka (Russian: сопка) is a general denomination used for hills and mountains with a rounded top and gentle slopes in the Transbaikal, the Kola Peninsula, and the Russian Far East, as well as for volcanoes in the Kamchatka Peninsula and Kuril Islands, and for mud volcanoes in Crimea and the Caucasus.

The probable origin of the word sopka is from Old Church Slavonic sop—an earthen embankment, hill, or mountain.

== Examples ==
- Avachinskaya Sopka
- Klyuchevskaya Sopka
- Koryakskaya Sopka
- Nikolskaya Sopka
