= Jeffrey Lewis (academic) =

American expert in nuclear nonproliferation

- Occupations: Professor, political scientist

Academic background
- Education: Augustana College (BA); University of Maryland (PhD)

Academic work
- Discipline: Nuclear nonproliferation and foreign policy
- Institutions: Center for International Security and Cooperation, Stanford University
- Website: www.nonproliferation.org www.armscontrolwonk.com

Jeffrey Lewis is an American expert in nuclear nonproliferation and geopolitics. Currently he is a faculty member of the Center for International Security and Cooperation, Stanford University Previously he was a professor at the James Martin Center for Nonproliferation Studies (CNS) at the Middlebury Institute of International Studies at Monterey, and director of the CNS East Asia Nonproliferation Program. He has written two books on China's nuclear weapons, and numerous journal and magazine articles, blog posts, and podcasts on nonproliferation and related topics.

Since 2004 Lewis has run the blog site Arms Control Wonk, later hosting a podcast by the same name with Aaron Stein.

Lewis has been cited as an expert on nuclear programs of China, North Korea, Iran, Pakistan, and South Africa in the media.

His research interests have also included open-source intelligence, using and promoting the use of analysis of satellite images, photography, and other information sources to understand events and issues in proliferation and related topics.

== Education ==
Lewis received a PhD in Policy Studies from the University of Maryland and a B.A. in Philosophy and Political Science from Augustana College.

== Research and policy work ==
From 2007 to 2010, Lewis directed the Nuclear Strategy and Nonproliferation Initiative at the New America Foundation. From 2006 to 2007, he was Executive Director of the Managing the Atom Project at the Belfer Center for Science and International Affairs at Harvard University.

Since 2010, Lewis has been the Director of the East Asia Nonproliferation Program at the James Martin Center for Nonproliferation Studies at MIIS in Monterey, California, and an adjunct professor at MIIS. Research topics have included nuclear proliferation and weapons programs of China, North Korea, Iran, and other states, and open-source intelligence performed by the policy community itself (see for example Eliot Higgins).

He has worked with graduate students and MIIS and other researchers to develop tools and provide training on tools and technology for open source intelligence.

He is also an affiliate with the Stanford University Center for International Security and Cooperation.

In 2026, he took a faculty position at the Center for International Security and Cooperation within the Freeman Spogli Institute for International Studies, Stanford University, as a Senior Research Scholar and William J. Perry Lecturer.

=== North Korea ===
Lewis has extensively written and spoken, including for media reports, on the weapons tests, development program, and missile programs of North Korea, a country covered by the East Asia Nonproliferation Program.

Lewis has written specifically about North Korea's nuclear materials production; weapons design choices (including nuclear weapon size/miniaturization and use of fissile uranium or plutonium in warheads); missiles and the North Korean space program; North Korea's missile press coverage, propaganda, and misinformation. He makes frequent use of open source intelligence from satellite and press/propaganda images and stories.

On April 27, 2017, Lewis dismissed the notion, promoted by Peter Vincent Pry and others, that North Korea could seriously harm the United States with an EMP weapon.

=== China ===
One of the countries covered by the East Asia Nonproliferation Program, China has been a focus for Lewis, including his two books and monograph. His books Paper Tigers: China's Nuclear Posture (2014) and The Minimum Means of Reprisal: China's Search for Security in the Nuclear Age (2007) examine China's nuclear weapons and missiles policies. He wrote, podcasted, and was cited in mainstream press coverage in 2015 rebutting claims that China's adding MIRVs to its larger missiles was a dangerous escalation, arguing instead that it was a natural evolution for the Chinese older, larger missile force. He has also studied and written about China's nuclear program as it relates to other powers such as India.

Lewis has also written on China's conventional weapons program, including antiship and conventional ballistic missile programs and their testing of a hypervelocity weapon system.

In November 2024, Lewis was part of a team of open source researchers at the Middlebury Institute of International Studies at Monterey that identified the location of China's land-based prototype nuclear reactor for a large surface warship near Leshan, Sichuan province, concluding that it was for a nuclear-powered aircraft carrier.

== Publications ==
=== Books ===
- The 2020 Commission Report on the North Korean Nuclear Attacks Against the United States: A Speculative Novel – Mariner Books (2018) – ISBN 978-1328573926
- Paper Tigers: China's Nuclear Posture – Adelphi Series – Routledge (2014) – ISBN 978-1138907140
- The Minimum Means of Reprisal: China's Search for Security in the Nuclear Age – MIT Press (2007) – ISBN 978-0262622028

=== Monographs ===
- A Place for One's Mat: China's Space Program, 1956–2003 (with Gregory Kulacki), American Academy of Arts and Sciences Occasional Paper (July 2009).

=== Journals ===
Lewis has written for Bulletin of the Atomic Scientists, Foreign Policy magazine, Jane's Intelligence Review, Nonproliferation Review and New Scientist among other journals.

=== Blogs and online journals ===
Lewis is the publisher of Arms Control Wonk blog. He additionally contributes to Foreign Policy – ForeignPolicy.com columnist since 2013., and to 38 North, an online journal on published by the US-Korea Institute at the Paul H. Nitze School of Advanced International Studies at Johns Hopkins University.
