= Rupsi Airport =

Airport of Assam, India

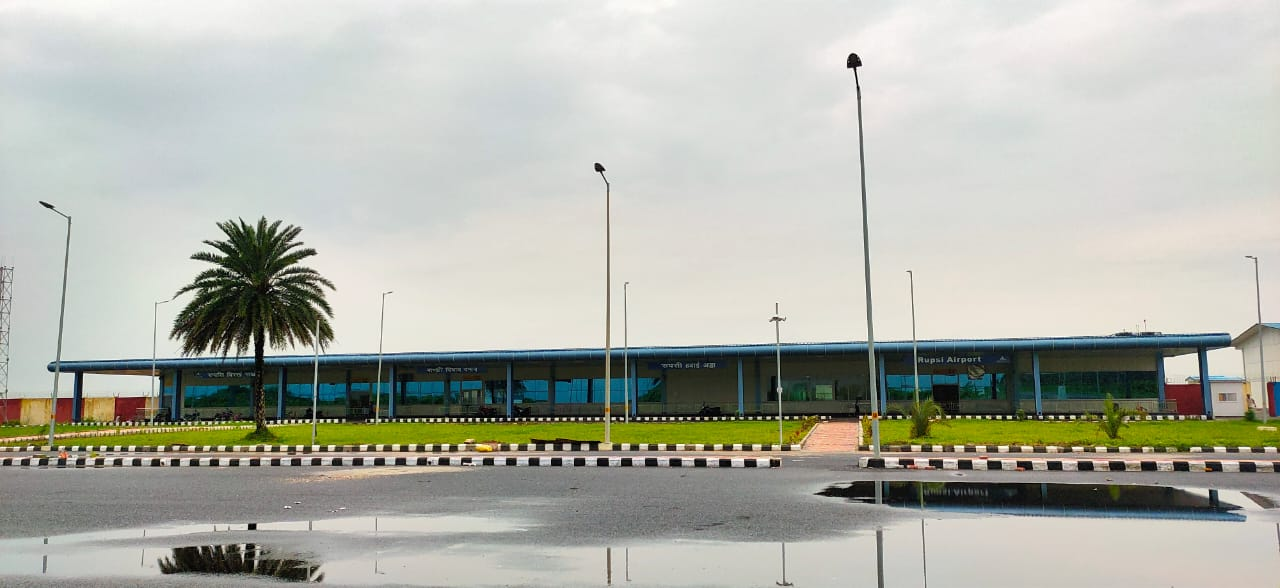
- IATA: RUP; ICAO: VERU

Summary
- Airport type: Public
- Owner: Government of India
- Operator: Airports Authority of India
- Serves: Dhubri and Kokrajhar
- Location: Rupsi, Kokrajhar district, Bodoland, Assam, India
- Elevation AMSL: 40 m (130 ft)
- Coordinates: 26°08′28″N 089°54′24″E

Map
- Location of airport in Assam RUP (India)

Runways
Direction	Length		Surface
Direction	m	ft	Surface
05/23	1,829	6,000	Asphalt

Statistics (April 2025 – March 2026)
- Passengers: 8,375 (▲17.6%)
- Aircraft movements: 252 (▲53.7%)
- Cargo tonnage: 0 ( 0%)
- Source: AAI

Rupsi Airport (IATA: RUP, ICAO: VERU) is a domestic airport serving the cities of Dhubri and Kokrajhar, Assam, India. It is located at Rupsi, 17 km (11 mi) north from the Dhubri city centre. The airport serves as a way for people of the lower part of Assam to travel to India's major cities and states. It also serves as a layover for those traveling to the wildlife parks of Chakrashila Wildlife Sanctuary, Ultapani Reserve Forest and Manas National Park of Assam and Jaldapara National Park in Alipurduar district and Buxa Tiger Reserve of West Bengal.

== History ==
The Rupsi Airfield was constructed by the British during World War II to supply arms, manpower, and ammunition to the Allied forces. It was used by the United States Army Air Forces' Tenth Air Force in the China-Burma-India Theater. The regional airline, Vayudoot, used to operate services to the airport in the 1980s, but withdrew services after the closure of the airline in 1984, after which the Government of India made unsuccessful attempts to revive the airport with the joint initiative of the Ministry of Civil Aviation and the North Eastern Council (NEC). The World War II era airstrip remained defunct since 1984. The Airports Authority of India (AAI) and the Indian Air Force (IAF) have begun work to revive the airfield since 2010s. Finally, commercial operations to the airport began under the Government's UDAN Scheme in 2021.

The then Chief Minister of Assam, Sarbananda Sonowal, along with Bodoland Territorial Council (BTC) Chief, Hagrama Mohilary, laid the foundation stone of construction of the airport's terminal on 22 February 2019. An estimated cost of Rs. 70 crore was spent to make the airport suitable for the operation of ATR-72 type of aircraft, including the 3,500-square-meter (38,000 sq ft) terminal building. The infrastructure for the airport was made ready by October 2019. The newly launched domestic airline, FlyBig, started operations in the airport on 8 May 2021, by starting flight services to Guwahati and Kolkata. In the future, other destinations from the airport will be covered. On 5 May 2021, FlyBig conducted a successful trial of its flight at the airport. The AAI and IAF will jointly develop the airport for both commercial and military operations. The IAF is also evaluating the feasibility of extending the runway to 10,000 feet (3,000 m) to enable the operation of fighter aircraft.

== Facilities ==
The airport covers an area of 447 acres (181 ha) at an elevation of 131 feet (40 m) above mean sea level. It has one paved runway designated 05/23, which measures 6,000 by 150 feet (1,829 m × 46 m).

== Airlines and destinations ==
Airlines	Destinations
Alliance Air	Guwahati, Kolkata

== See also ==
- Dibrugarh Airport
- Lilabari Airport
- Silchar Airport
- Tezpur Airport
