= 2078 (disambiguation) =

2078 is a year in the 2070s decade

2078 may also refer to

- The year 2078 BC in the 21st century BC
- 2078, a story arc in the Philippines comic strip Pugad Baboy
- 2078 Nanking, a Mars-crossing asteroid
- 2078th Air Weather Reconnaissance Squadron, United States Air Force unit
