= 36th Reconnaissance Squadron =

36th Reconnaissance Squadron may refer to:

- The 425th Bombardment Squadron, designated the 36th Reconnaissance Squadron (Heavy) in April 1942.
- The 36th Photographic Reconnaissance Squadron
