= 375th Bombardment Squadron =

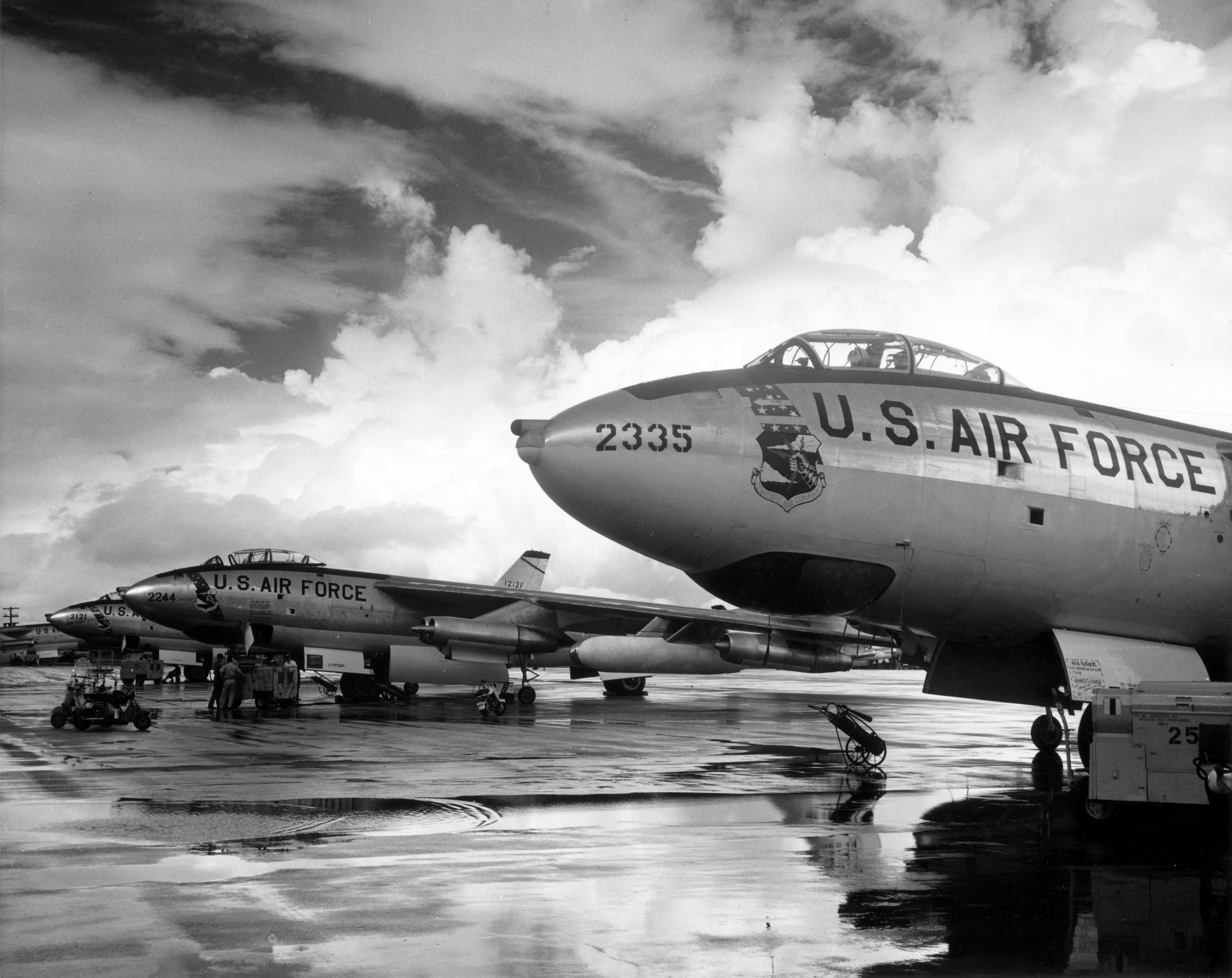
- Strategic Air Command B-47 Stratojets as flown by the squadron
- Active: 1942–1946; 1947–1951; 1951–1961
- Country: United States
- Branch: United States Air Force
- Role: Bombardment
- Engagements: China Burma India Theater
- Decorations: Distinguished Unit Citation; Air Force Outstanding Unit Award

Insignia
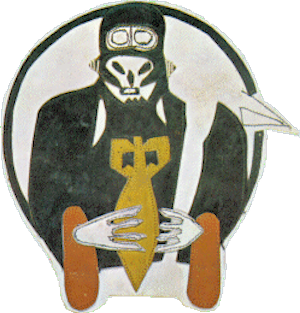
- 375th Bombardment Squadron emblem (Note: Approved 11 January 1943. Description: Over and through a white disc, border black a skeleton in black cloak, wearing black aviator's helmet and white goggles, ear phones and chin strap trimmed black, holding in the right hand a yellow aerial bomb point down, and in the left hand a scythe white trimmed black, inner folds of sleeve magenta.)

The 375th Bombardment Squadron is an inactive United States Air Force unit. Its last assignment was with 308th Bombardment Wing at Plattsburgh Air Force Base, New York.

The squadron was first activated in April 1942. After training in the United States, the squadron deployed to China in early 1943. It engaged in combat, primarily in China and Southeast Asia until June 1945, when it assumed a mainly transport role. It was awarded two Distinguished Unit Citations for its operations in China and its attacks on Japanese shipping. At the end of 1945 it returned to the United States for inactivation.

The squadron was redesignated the 375th Reconnaissance Squadron and activated in Alaska in 1947. It was inactivated in 1949. It returned to its bombardment designation in 1951 and operated Boeing B-47 Stratojets for Strategic Air Command. In 1959 it moved as part of a test of a "super wing" concept, but was not operational until in inactivated in 1961.

== History ==
=== World War II ===
==== Initial organization and training ====
The squadron was activated at Gowen Field, Idaho on 15 April 1942 as the 375th Bombardment Squadron, one of the four original squadrons of the 308th Bombardment Group. As the squadron was forming and beginning its training in Consolidated B-24 Liberators, at Alamogordo Army Air Field, New Mexico in August 1942, almost all its personnel were transferred to the 330th Bombardment Group.

The following month, a fresh cadre taken from the 39th Bombardment Group joined the group. In addition to its own training activities, at the beginning of October, the unit was briefly designated as an Operational Training Unit The squadron began its movement to the China Burma India Theater in January 1943. The air echelon ferried its Liberators across the Atlantic and Africa, leaving from Morrison Field, while the ground echelon moved by ship across the Pacific.

==== Combat operations ====
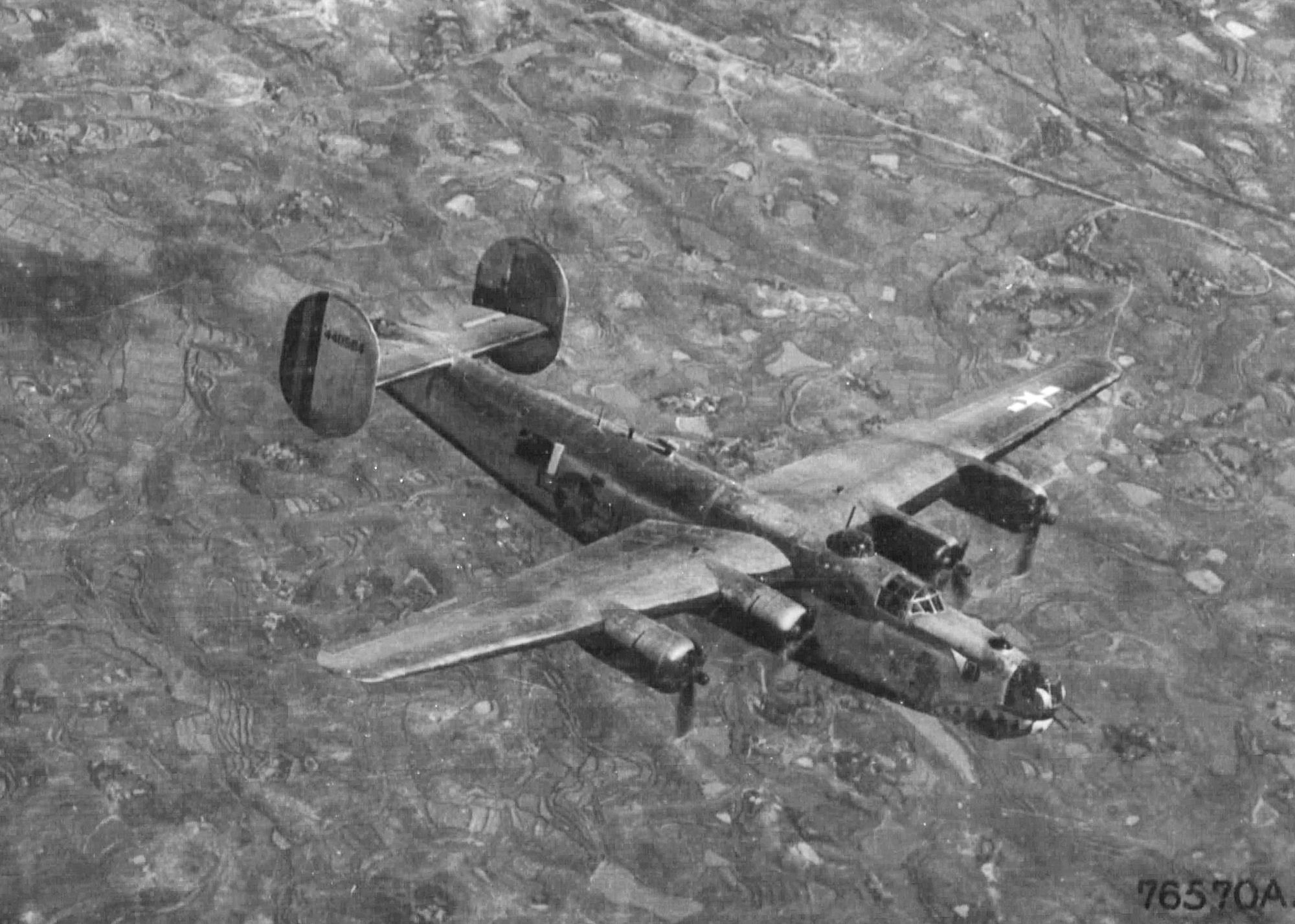
Squadron B-24 King's X over China on 16 September 1944 (Note: Aircraft is Consolidated B-24J-170-CO Liberator, serial 44-40584 King's X. This aircraft was severely damaged in a landing accident at Chengtu Airfield on 23 February 1945. Baugher, Joe (9 October 2023). "1944 USAF Serial Numbers". Joe Baugher.)

In late March 1943, the squadron arrived at Chengkung Airfield, China. In order to prepare for and sustain combat operations in China, the squadron had to conduct numerous flights over the Hump transporting gasoline, lubricants, ordnance, spare parts and the other items it needed. The 375th supported Chinese ground forces and attacked airfields, coal yards, docks, oil refineries and fuel dumps in French Indochina. It attacked shipping, mined rivers and ports and bombed maintenance shops and docks at Rangoon, Burma and attacked Japanese shipping in the East China Sea, Formosa Straits, South China Sea and Gulf of Tonkin. On 21 August 1943, the squadron conducted an unescorted bombing attack on docks and warehouses at Hankow, China, pressing its attack despite heavy flak and fighter opposition. For this mission it was awarded a Distinguished Unit Citation (DUC). Its operations interdicting Japanese shipping in 1944 and 1945 earned it a second (DUC).

The squadron moved to Rupsi Airfield, Assam, India in June 1945. Its mission again was primarily air transport as it ferried gasoline and supplies from there back into China. The unit sailed for the United States in October 1945, and it was inactivated at the Port of Embarkation on 6 January 1946.

=== Weather reconnaissance ===
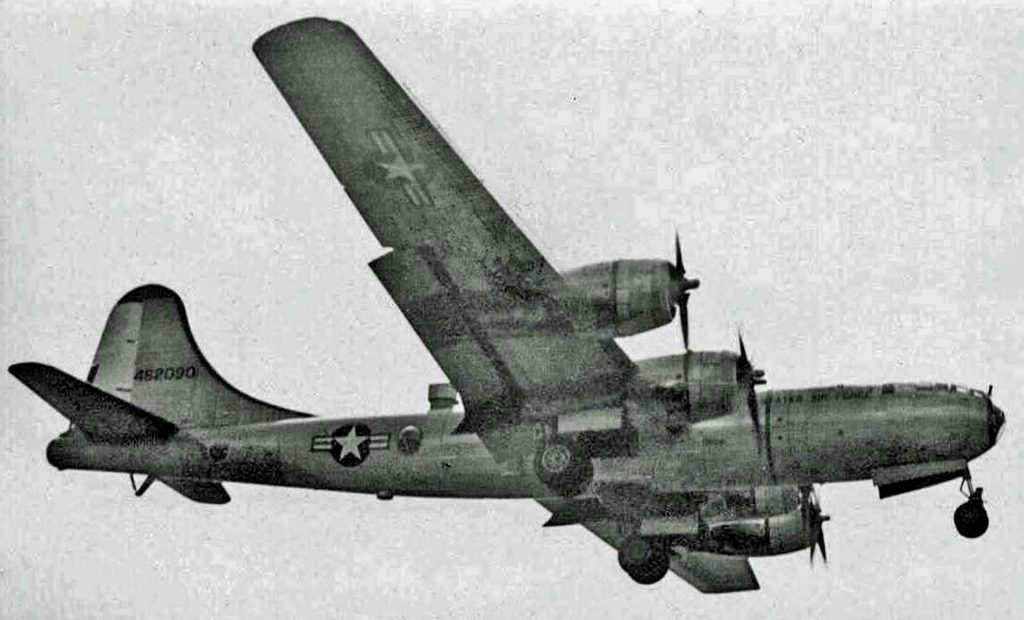
Boeing WB-29A

The squadron was reactivated at Ladd Field, Alaska on 15 October 1947 as the 375th Reconnaissance Squadron, an Air Weather Service weather reconnaissance squadron, assuming the personnel and Boeing B-29 Superfortresses of the 59th Reconnaissance Squadron, which was simultaneously inactivated. The squadron performed weather reconnaissance. In March 1949, the squadron moved to Eielson Air Force Base, Alaska, where it was inactivated in February 1951 and its personnel and equipment transferred to the 59th Strategic Reconnaissance Squadron.

=== Strategic Air Command ===
In October 1951, the squadron was activated, again as the 375th Bombardment Squadron, at Forbes Air Force Base, Kansas, but did not become operational until 10 November with B-29 Superfortress bombers. Although assigned to the 308th Bombardment Group, the group was a paper organization and the squadron was attached to other organizations until June 1952, (Note: Maurer indicates the squadron was attached to the 21st Air Division while stationed at Forbes. Ravenstein gives attachment to the 308th Bombardment Wing at both Forbes and Hunter.) when the group inactivated and the 375th was assigned directly to the 308th Bombardment Wing.

In April 1952, the squadron moved to Hunter Air Force Base, Georgia, and in 1953 began to equip with Boeing B-47 Stratojets. The squadron detached forces to bases in North Africa, and from 21 August until late October 1956, deployed with the entire 308th Wing to Sidi Slimane Air Base, Morocco. Overseas Operation Reflex alert operations began in October 1957. Reflex placed Stratojets and Boeing KC-97 Stratofreighters at bases closer to the Soviet Union for 90 day periods, although individuals rotated back to home bases during unit Reflex deployments.

As the Soviet Union built up its strategic bomber force in the 1950s, defense planners studied ways to defend against a surprise attack. Strategic Air Command (SAC) proposed keeping its bombers and supporting tankers on ground alert with weapons loaded and crews ready for takeoff. General Thomas S. Power, the commander of SAC, announced a goal of maintaining one third of SAC’s planes on fifteen minute ground alert, fully fueled and ready for combat. From November 1956 to October 1957, the squadron participated in Operation Try Out to test the feasibility of the alert concept. Following two additional tests, the plan was implemented, reducing the amount of time the squadron spent on alert at overseas bases.

In July 1959 SAC began a test of a "super wing" at Hunter. In this test, all B-47s at Hunter were transferred to the 2d Bombardment Wing and the squadron, along with other elements of the 308th Wing, became nonoperational. The squadron continued in this status until it was inactivated on 25 June 1961.

== Lineage ==
- Constituted as the 375th Bombardment Squadron (Heavy) on 28 January 1942

Activated on 15 April 1942
Redesignated 375th Bombardment Squadron, Heavy in 1944
Inactivated on 6 January 1946
Redesignated 375th Reconnaissance Squadron (Very Long Range, Weather) on 16 September 1947
Activated on 15 October 1947
Inactivated on 21 February 1951
Redesignated 375th Bombardment Squadron, Medium on 4 October 1951
Activated on 10 October 1951
Discontinued and inactivated on 25 June 1961

=== Assignments ===
- 308th Bombardment Group, 15 April 1942 – 6 January 1946
- 7th Weather Group (later 2107th Air Weather Group), 15 October 1947 – 21 February 1951
- 308th Bombardment Group, 10 October 1951 (attached to 21st Air Division until 17 April 1952, then to 308th Bombardment Wing)
- 308th Bombardment Wing, 16 June 1952 – 25 June 1961

=== Stations ===
- Gowen Field, Idaho, 15 April 1942
- Davis-Monthan Field, Arizona, 18 June 1942
- Alamogordo Army Air Field, New Mexico, 24 July 1942
- Davis-Monthan Field, Arizona, 28 August 1942
- Wendover Field, Utah, 1 October 1942
- Pueblo Army Air Base, Colorado, 1 December 1942 – 2 January 1943
- Chengkung Airfield, China, 20 March 1943
- Hsinching Airfield, China, 18 February 1945
- Rupsi Airfield, India, 27 June-14 October 1945
- Camp Kilmer, New Jersey, 5–6 January 1946
- Ladd Field, Alaska, 15 October 1947 (one flight operated from Fairfield-Suisun Army Air Field, California, and later from Shemya Air Force Base, Alaska, 15 October 1947-15 May 1949)
- Eielson Air Force Base, Alaska, 6 March 1949 – 21 February 1951
- Forbes Air Force Base, Kansas, 10 October 1951
- Hunter Air Force Base, Georgia, 17 April 1952
- Plattsburgh Air Force Base, New York, 15 July 1959 – 25 June 1961

=== Aircraft ===
- Douglas B-18 Bolo, 1942
- Consolidated B-24 Liberator, 1942–1945
- Boeing B-29 Superfortress, 1947–1951, 1951-1952
- Boeing RB-29 (later WB-29)Superfortress, 1947–1951
- Douglas C-47 Skytrain, 1947–1951
- Boeing B-47 Stratojet, 1953–1959

=== Awards and campaigns ===
Award streamer	Award	Dates	Notes
	Distinguished Unit Citation	21 August 1943	China,
	Distinguished Unit Citation	24 May 1944–28 April 1945	East and South China Seas, Straits of Formosa and Gulf of Tonkin,
	Air Force Outstanding Unit Award	1 November 1956–1 April 1957	

Campaign Streamer	Campaign	Dates	Notes
	Air Offensive, Japan	20 Mar 1943–2 September 1945	
	Air Combat, Asiatic–Pacific Theater	20 March 1943-19 December 1945	
	New Guinea	20 March 1943–31 December 1944	
	China Defensive	20 March 1943–4 May 1945	
	India-Burma	2 April 1943–28 January 1945	
	Western Pacific	17 April 1945–2 September 1945	
	China Offensive	5 May 1945–2 September 1945	

== See also ==
- B-24 Liberator units of the United States Army Air Forces
- List of B-29 Superfortress operators
- List of B-47 units of the United States Air Force
