= Lilabari Airport =

Airport in Lakhimpur district, Assam, India

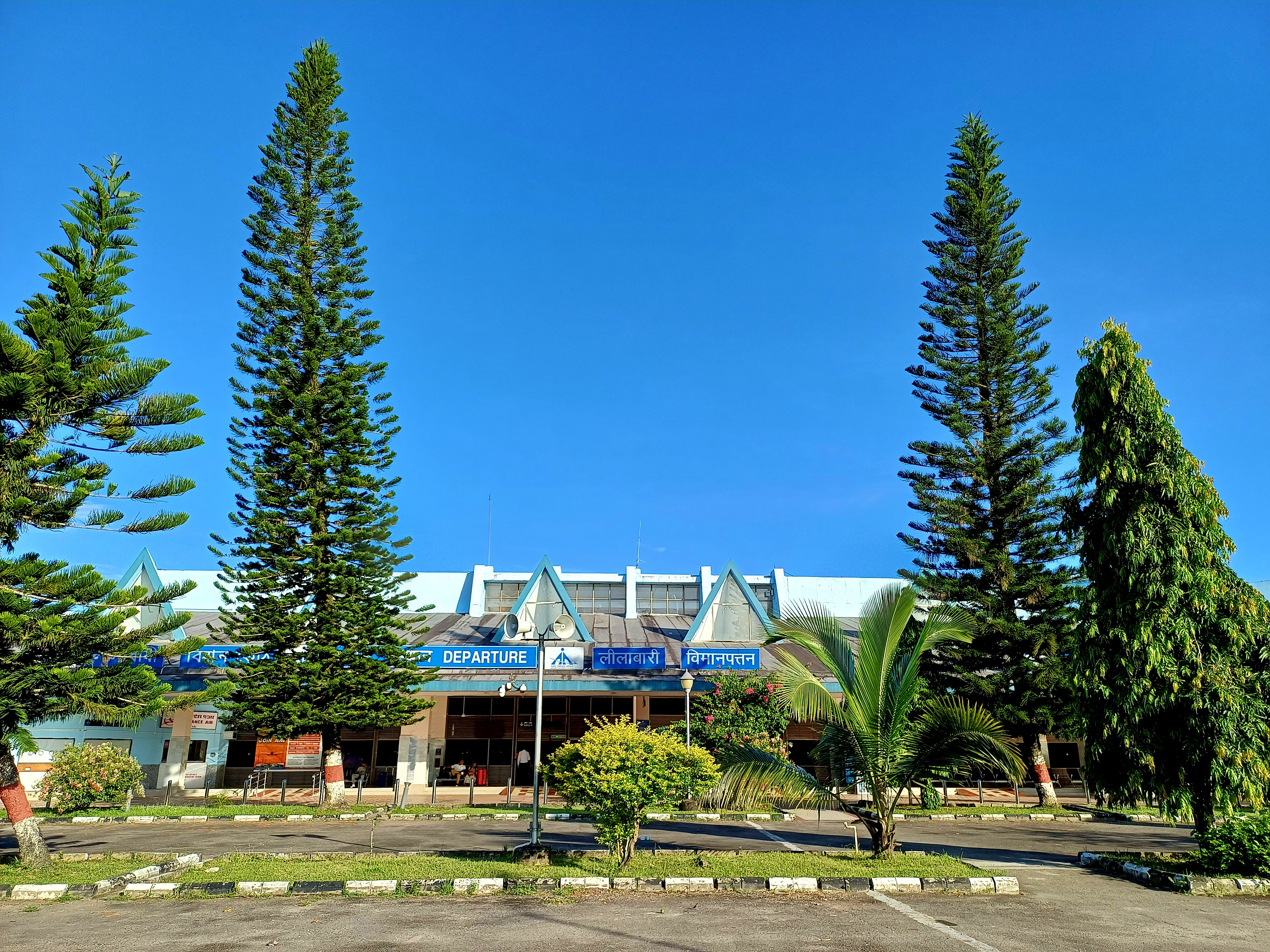
- IATA: IXI; ICAO: VELR

Summary
- Airport type: Public
- Operator: Airports Authority of India
- Serves: North Lakhimpur
- Location: Lilabari, North Lakhimpur, Assam, India
- Elevation AMSL: 330 ft (100 m)
- Coordinates: 27°17′44″N 094°05′52″E
- Website: Lilabari Airport

Map
- Location within Assam Location within India

Runways
Direction	Length		Surface
Direction	ft	m	Surface
04/22	7,500	2,286	Concrete/Asphalt

Statistics (April 2025 - March 2026)
- Passengers: 13,436 (▼ -55.4%)
- Aircraft movements: 377 (▼ -47.6%)
- Cargo tonnage: 0 (▼ -100%)
- Source: AAI

Lilabari Airport (IATA: IXI, ICAO: VELR), also known as North Lakhimpur Airport, is a domestic airport serving the city of North Lakhimpur in Assam, India. It is located at Lilabari, 8 km (5.0 mi) north from the city centre.

== History ==
The Lilabari airport project in Lakhimpur began following hectic campaigning and lobbying by local Member of Parliament (MP), Dr Ranee Narah from 1999 to 2003. Construction of the airport had finished by 2003, and the terminal was inaugurated by then Union Civil Aviation Minister Syed Shahnawaz Hussain.

Lilabari Airfield has a little-known but significant history as a forward operating base for the Indian Air Force. During the 1962 Sino-Indian War and in the decades that followed, the IAF used the airfield for airlift, surveillance, and logistical support in the Northeast frontier. Its proximity to strategic regions made it a quiet but vital asset, particularly during operations in Arunachal Pradesh.

== Current status ==
- The airport is equipped with a night landing facility, and the runway is being modified to operate larger aircraft.

== Airlines and destinations ==
Airlines	Destinations
Alliance Air	Guwahati, Kolkata, Shillong, Tezpur

== See also ==
- Dibrugarh Airport
- Rupsi Airport
- Silchar Airport
- Tezpur Airport
