= 16th Weapons Squadron =

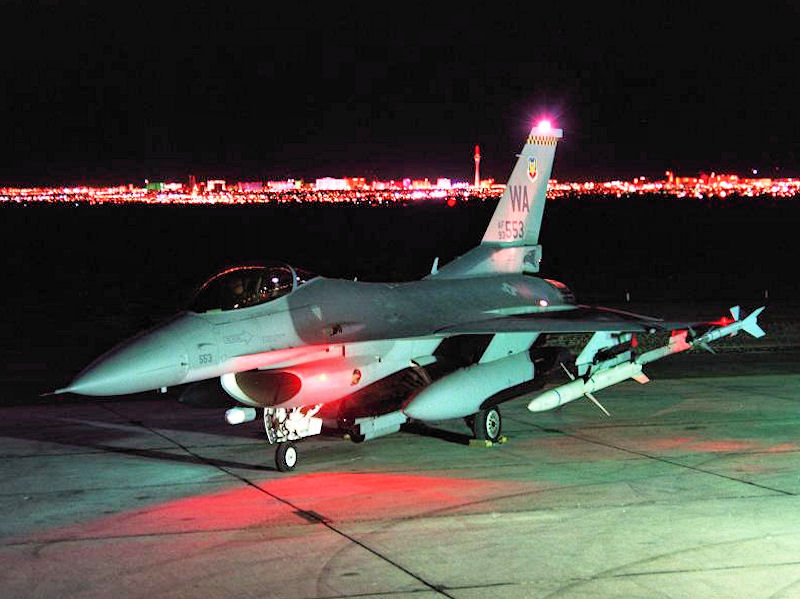
- F-16C Fighting Falcon from the USAF Fighter Weapons School on the ramp at Nellis AFB (Note: Aircraft is General Dynamics F-16C Block 52, serial 93-553 at night with the Las Vegas "Strip" in the background. The aircraft sits after being loaded and prepared for a night training flight.)
- Active: 1940–Current
- Country: United States
- Branch: United States Air Force
- Role: Advanced Fighter Training
- Part of: Air Combat Command
- Garrison/HQ: Nellis AFB, Nevada
- Nickname(s): Flying Wall (WW II) Tomahawks
- Tail Code: "WA"
- Engagements: Southwest Pacific Theater; China Burma India Theater Korean War

- Decorations: Distinguished Unit Citation Air Force Outstanding Unit Award (5x) Republic of Korea Presidential Unit Citation (2x)

Insignia
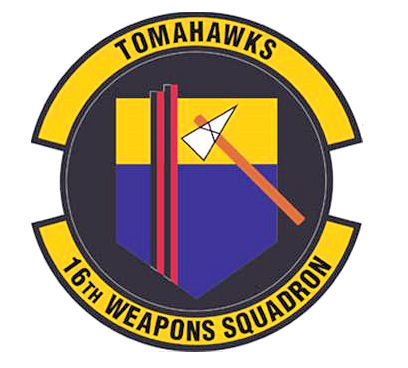
- 16th Weapons Squadron emblem

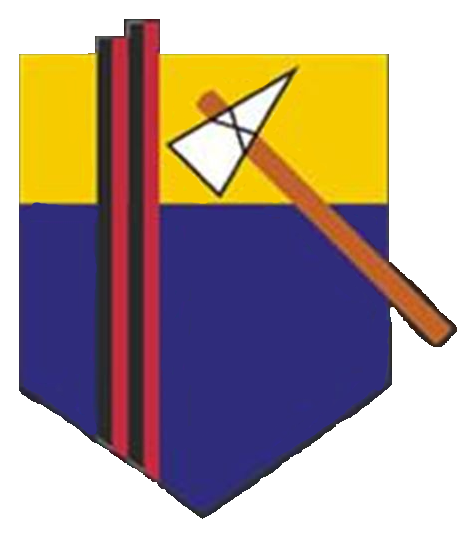
- 16 Fighter-Interceptor Sq emblem (approved 16 November 1961)

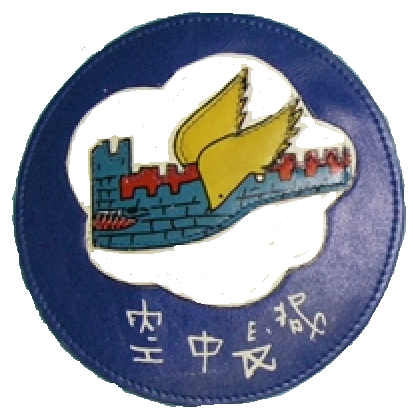
- 16th Fighter Sq emblem (World War II)

The 16th Weapons Squadron is a United States Air Force unit. It is assigned to the USAF Weapons School, based at Nellis Air Force Base, Nevada.

The 16th began as the 16th Pursuit Squadron on 20 November 1940. During World War II, the 16th Squadron flew missions in New Guinea, India, and China in the Curtiss P-40 Warhawk, Republic P-47 Thunderbolt, and North American P-51 Mustang. During the Korean War, the 16th Fighter-Interceptor Squadron flew missions from Korea and Japan in the Lockheed F-80 Shooting Star and North American F-86 Sabre. After the Korean War, the 16th was stationed in Japan, Taiwan, Florida, Norway, Turkey, Korea, and Utah, flying missions in the Convair F-102 Delta Dagger and McDonnell F-4 Phantom II aircraft.

In January 1979, the 16th Tactical Fighter Training Squadron became the USAF's first F-16A/B operational squadron.

== History ==
=== World War II ===
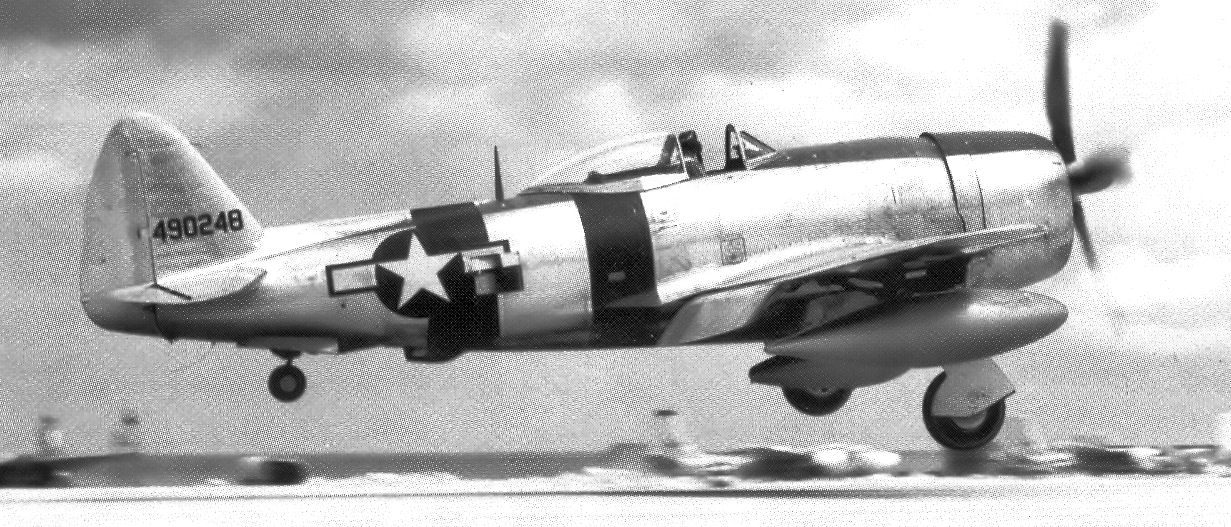
16th Fighter Squadron P-47D Thunderbolt (Note: Aircraft is Republic P-47D-30-RA Thunderbolt, serial 44-90248 at Yontan Airfield, Okinawa, 1946.)

Activated at Hamilton Field, California in 1941 as a Curtiss P-40 Warhawk pursuit squadron to defend the West Coast. Deployed to the CBI in March 1942, initially arriving at Karachi, India moving via Australia and Ceylon. It was assigned to Tenth Air Force. The squadron defended the Indian terminus of The Hump over the Himalayas between India and China and airfields in that area, operating from the Assam Valley of northeast India. The squadron flew strafing, bombing, reconnaissance, and patrol missions in support of Allied ground troops during a Japanese offensive in northern Burma in 1943.

Moved to southeast China in October 1943, being assigned to Fourteenth Air Force. The squadron defended the Chinese end of the Hump route and air bases in the Kunming area. Attacked Japanese shipping in the Red River delta of Indochina and supported Chinese ground forces in their late 1944 drive along the Salween River. Was reequipped with North American P-51D Mustangs in 1945 to defend the eastern end of the route over the Hump, and to guard air bases in the Kunming area.

They returned to India in the fall of 1945 and sailed for the United States in November. Inactivated on 13 December 1945.

=== Air defense in the Pacific ===
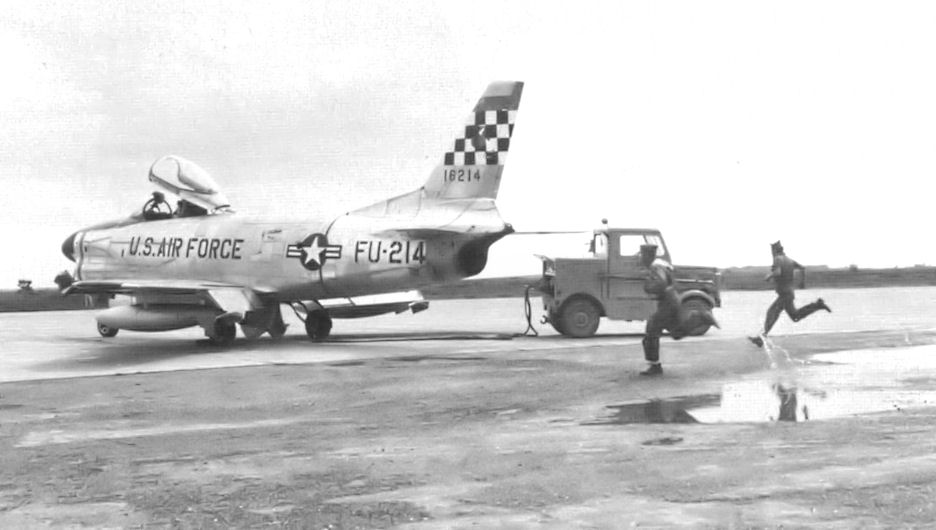
16th Fighter-Interceptor Squadron F-86D Sabre (Note: Aircraft is North American F-86D-35-NA Sabre serial 51-6214, assigned to Naha Air Base, Okinawa, shown at Chia-Yi Afld, Taiwan, 1955.)

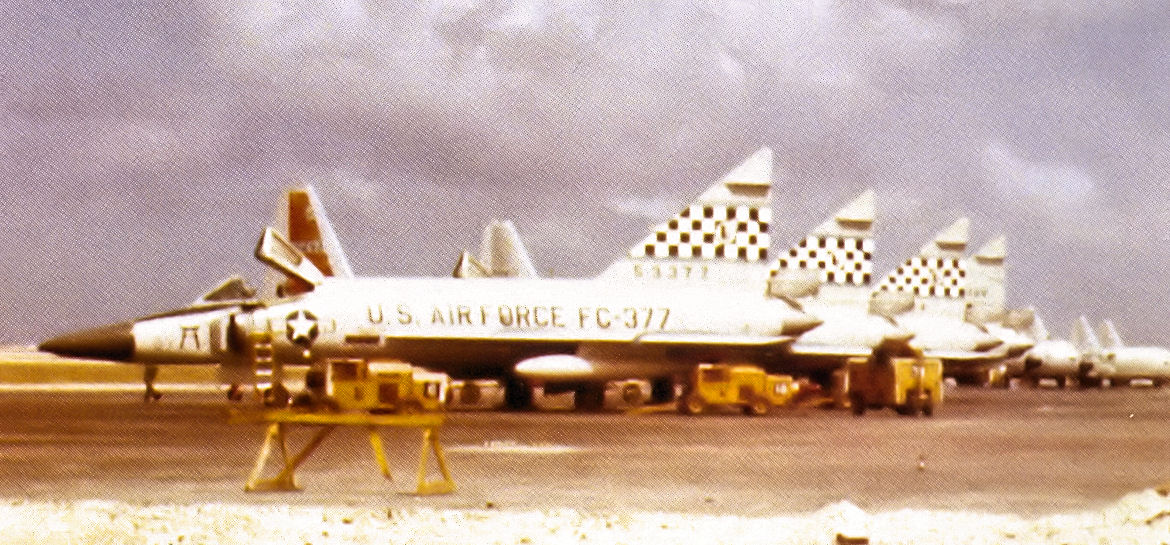
16th Fighter-Interceptor Squadron F-102A Delta Dagger (Note: Aircraft is Convair F-102A-75-CO Delta Dagger serial 56-1377 at Naha AB, Okinawa, 1964.)

Reactivated at Yontan Air Base Okinawa in 1946 and moved to Naha Air Base when Yontan closed in 1947. The squadron was assigned to the 301st Fighter Wing. Pilots engaged in combat operations in the Korean War, 1950–1953, returned to Naha Air Base to resume air defense coverage of the Ryukyu Islands in 1954.

From August 1958 to January 1959, deployed to Tainan Air Base Taiwan to fly combat air support missions for Nationalist Chinese forces after mainland Communist Chinese forces shelled the Nationalist-held islands of Quemoy and Matsu.

In the early 1960s, the Air Force was implementing Project Clearwater, an initiative to withdraw Convair F-102 Delta Daggers from overseas bases in order to reduce "gold flow" (negative foreign currency transactions). By 1963, part of Clearwater called for the 16th to move to Davis-Monthan Air Force Base, Arizona, (Note: The original plan was to move the 16th to Edwards Air Force Base, but military construction costs to base the squadron there were prohibitive, so Davis-Monthan was selected. McMullen, pp. 60–61) permitting the McDonnell F-101 Voodoos of the 15th Fighter-Interceptor Squadron stationed there to be distributed to other Air Defense Command squadrons. However, the Gulf of Tonkin incident intervened and the 16th was kept in the Pacific to maintain an air defense capability there. It deployed F-102s to the Philippines and South Vietnam from August to October 1964 for air defense against possible North Vietnamese air attacks.

=== Tactical fighter operations ===
Returned to the United States, activating at Eglin Air Force Base, Florida. Became combat ready in the McDonnell F-4 Phantom II aircraft in December 1965 with a program of tactical training operations to maintain proficiency. Participated in numerous airpower demonstrations, provided close air support of Army troops during tactical exercises, and prepared for overseas deployments.

From December 1966 to mid-1967 performed F-4 replacement training. Through deployment of combat-ready tactical components, with personnel and equipment transferred to Pacific Air Forces units upon arrival, the squadron provided fresh aircraft and aircrews for the forces in Southeast Asia, twice relinquished all its resources for combat and remanned in October 1967 and April 1969. Deployed to South Korea, and assumed alert status at Kunsan Kunsan and Osan Air Bases June–September 1970, providing air defense, participating in exercises, and maintaining combat readiness.

Moved to Hill Air Force Base, Utah, and received first production General Dynamics F-16A Fighting Falcon aircraft to be delivered to an operational squadron on 6 January 1979. Many of the early F-16 pilots went through the 16th Tactical Fighter Training Squadron, as it was the first Replacement Training Unit for the F-16 and acted as a worldwide training unit, training over 240 pilots in the F-16.

In April 1983 the unit became the 16th Tactical Fighter Squadron but still kept its training role, although not for beginner pilots but for higher levels of combat training. It was only fitting that as the world's first F-16 squadron that the 16th received the 1,000th F-16 to come off the General Dynamics assembly line on 22 July 1983. During the three years of operational tasking the squadron continued to train and upgrade its pilots to combat ready status and to maintain the capability to deploy worldwide on short notice and employ the F-16 in the conventional air-to-air and air-to-ground combat roles. The unit inactivated on 30 June 1986.

=== Fighter weapons training ===
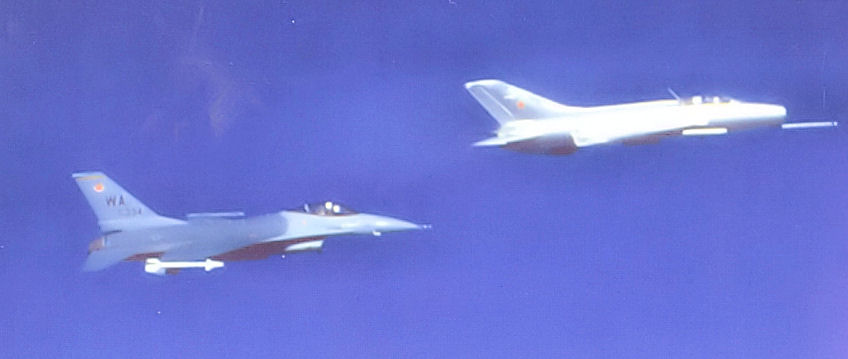
USAF Fighter Weapons School F-16 flying with a Constant Peg MiG-21 over the Nevada desert, about 1986

Initially there was an F-16 division within the Fighter Weapons School that was created in 1982 and produced its first graduating class. The purpose of the school was to train aircrew in a most realistic combat environment.

Reactivated on 3 February 2003 as the 16th Weapons Squadron. The squadron is composed of block 42 and 52's. Only a few days before on 24 January 2003 the squadron officially was redesignated the 16th Weapons Squadron while working towards activation at Nellis Air Force Base, Nevada.

== Lineage ==
- Constituted as the 16th Pursuit Squadron (Interceptor) on 20 November 1940

Activated on 15 January 1941
Redesignated: 16th Pursuit Squadron (Fighter) on 12 March 1941
Redesignated: 16th Fighter Squadron (Twin Engine) on 15 May 1942
Redesignated: 16th Fighter Squadron (Single Engine) on 1 June 1942
Redesignated: 16th Fighter Squadron, Single Engine on 20 August 1943
Inactivated on 7 December 1945

- Activated on 15 October 1946

Redesignated 16th Fighter Squadron, Jet Propelled on 19 February 1947
Redesignated 16th Fighter Squadron, Jet on 19 August 1948
Redesignated 16th Fighter-Interceptor Squadron on 1 February 1950
Discontinued and inactivated, on 24 December 1964

- Redesignated 16th Tactical Fighter Squadron and activated, on 18 June 1965 (not organized)

Organized on 20 June 1965
Inactivated on 1 November 1970

- Redesignated 16th Tactical Fighter Training Squadron on 3 October 1978

Activated on 1 January 1979
Redesignated 16th Tactical Fighter Squadron on 1 April 1983
Inactivated on 30 June 1986

- Redesignated 16th Weapons Squadron on 24 January 2003

Activated on 3 February 2003

=== Assignments ===
- 51st Pursuit Group (later 51st Fighter Group), 15 January 1941 – 7 December 1945 (attached to 23d Fighter Group July 1942 – October 1943)
- 51st Fighter Group (later 51st Fighter-Interceptor Group), 15 October 1946 (attached to 51st Fighter-Interceptor Wing after 1 July 1957)
- 51st Fighter-Interceptor Wing, 25 October 1957 – 24 December 1964
- 33d Tactical Fighter Wing, 20 June 1965 – 1 November 1970 (attached to Tactical Air Forces Norway, 27 August-13 September 1966; 1 Tactical Air Force (Turkish), 13–31 October 1969; 354th Tactical Fighter Wing, 26 May-14 June 1970; 54th Tactical Fighter Wing, 15 June-7 September 1970)
- 388th Tactical Fighter Wing, 1 January 1979 – 30 June 1986
- USAF Weapons School, 3 February 2003 – present

=== Stations ===
- Hamilton Field, California, 15 January 1941
- March Field, California, 10 June 1941 – 12 January 1942
- Karachi, India, 12 March 1942
- Kunming, China, 27 June 1942

Detachment operated from Lingling, China, 10 July – August 1942

- Chongqing, China, 17 August 1942
- Guilin, China, 27 October 1942
- Zhanyi, China, 29 November 1942

Detachment operated from Yunnanyi, China, 26 December 1942 – March 1943

- Guilin, China, 31 March 1943
- Hengyang, China, September 1943
- Chengkung, China, 25 November 1943

Detachment operated from Tsuyung, China, 25 November 1943 – April 1944
Detachment operated from Nanning, China, February 1944
Detachment operated from Simao, China, April 1944
Detachment operated from Yunnanyi, China, May–July 1944
Detachment operated from Liangshan, China, 16–31 December 1944
Detachment operated from Guanghan, China, 24 December 1944 – 30 January 1945
Detachment operated from Laohekou, China, 1 January – 16 March 1945
Detachment operated from Baise, China, – 13 February April 1945
Detachment operated from Beihai, China, 7–19 August 1945

- Nanning, China, 19 August 1945
- Loping, China, September – November 1945
- Camp Kilmer, New Jersey, 6–7 December 1945
- Yontan Airfield, Okinawa, 15 October 1946
- Naha Air Base, Okinawa, 22 May 1947
- Itazuke Air Base, Japan, 22 September 1950
- Kimpo Air Base (K-14), South Korea, 22 October 1950
- Itazuke Air Base, Japan, 3 January 1951
- Tsuiki Air Base, Japan, 22 January 1951

Detachment operated from Suwon Air Base (K-13), South Korea, after 20 May 1951

- Suwon Air Base (K-13), South Korea, 29 July 1951
- Misawa Air Base, Japan, July 1954
- Naha Air Base, 1 August 1954 – 31 May 1971

Deployed at Chia-Yi Afld, Taiwan, 4–28 April and 1–30 June 1955
Deployed at Tainan Air Base, Taiwan, 24 August-early Oct and 5 November-18 December 1958
Deployed at Chia-Yi Afld, Taiwan, 19 December 1958 – 19 January 1959

- Eglin Air Force Base, Florida, 20 June 1965 – 1 November 1970

Deployed at Bodo Air Station, Norway, 27 August-13 September 1966
Deployed at Cigli Air Base, Turkey, 13–31 October 1969
Deployed at Kunsan Air Base, South Korea, 26 May-7 September 1970

- Hill Air Force Base, Utah, 1 January 1979 – 30 June 1986
- Nellis Air Force Base, Nevada, 3 February 2003 – present

=== Aircraft ===
- Curtiss P-40 Warhawk, 1941–1945
- North American P-51 Mustang, 1944–1945
- Republic P-47 Thunderbolt, 1946–1947
- Lockheed F-80 Shooting Star, 1947–1951
- North American F-86D Sabre, 1951–1959
- Convair F-102 Delta Dagger, 1959–1971
- McDonnell F-4 Phantom II, 1965–1970
- General Dynamics F-16 Fighting Falcon, 1979–1986, 2003–present
