= 308th Armament Systems Group =

308th Armament Systems Group

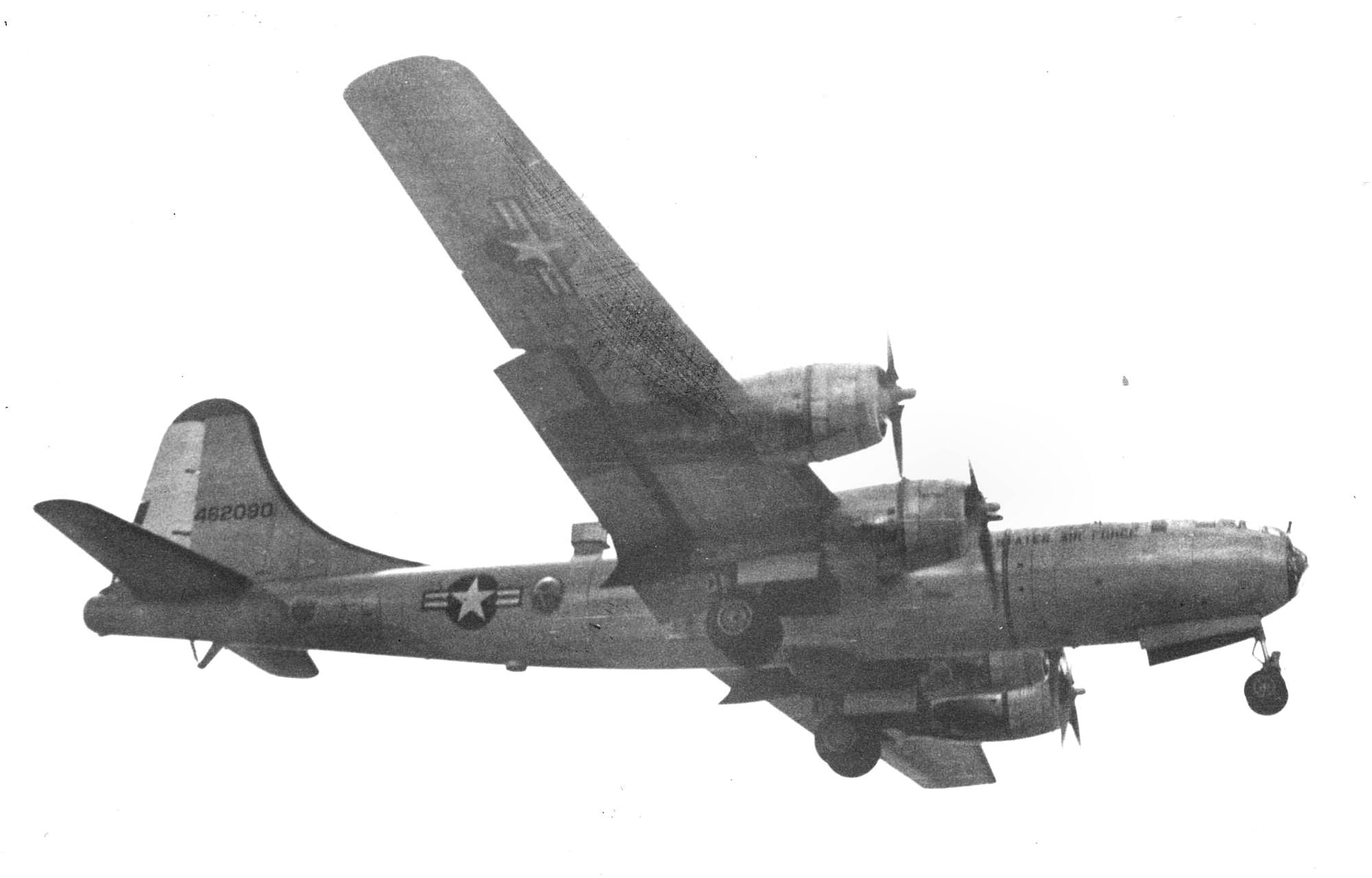
- WB-29 Superfortress weather reconnaissance plane
- Active: 1942–1946; 1946–1951; 1951–1952; 2005–present
- Country: United States
- Branch: United States Air Force
- Role: Systems development
- Part of: Air Force Materiel Command
- Garrison/HQ: Eglin Air Force Base
- Mottos: Percussus Resurgo (Latin for 'Beaten, I Rise') (World War II)
- Engagements: China-Burma-India Theater
- Decorations: Distinguished Unit Citation; Air Force Outstanding Unit Award

Insignia
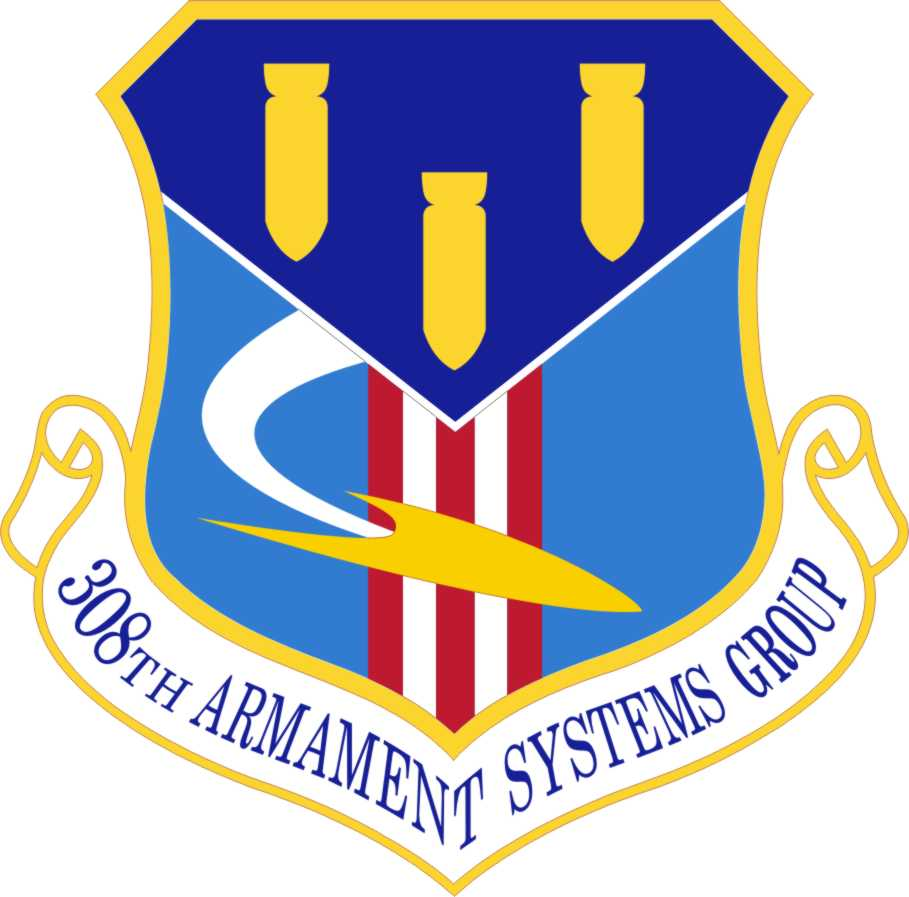
- 308th Armament Systems Group emblem (Note: The group uses the 308th Wing emblem with the group designation on the scroll. Robertson, Factsheet 308 Armament Systems Group. Maurer displays another emblem in its entry for the group, but this emblem was approved for the 308th Wing two months after the group was inactivated. Maurer, Combat Units, pp. 182, 184)

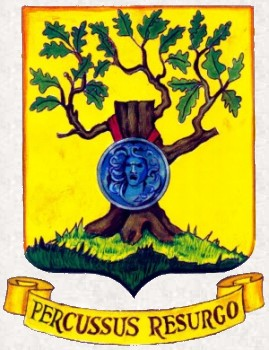
- 308th Bombardment Group emblem (World War II)

The 308th Armament Systems Group is a unit of the United States Air Force's 308th Armament Systems Wing, stationed at Eglin Air Force Base, Florida. The group was first activated at Gowen Field, Idaho as the 308th Bombardment Group. It served as a Consolidated B-24 Liberator unit in the China-Burma-India Theater, where it conducted long range bombing missions against Japanese forces, earning a Distinguished Unit Citation. Following V-J Day, it returned to the United States and was inactivated in January 1946.

In October 1946, the group was redesignated the 308th Reconnaissance Group and assigned to Air Weather Service (AWS) as a weather reconnaissance unit. It was inactivated in 1951, when AWS reassigned its components to regional weather organizations. It was again activated as a medium bomber unit under Strategic Air Command (SAC), but was inactivated in June 1952, when SAC adopted the dual deputy organization for its combat wings.

In May 2006, the group was consolidated with the Long Range Missile Systems Group At Eglin.

== Mission ==
The unit's mission is to equip warfighters with long range, precision attack capabilities.

== History ==
=== World War II ===
Constituted as 308th Bombardment Group (Heavy) on 28 January 1942, and activated on 15 April. Assigned to II Bomber Command for training. Received deployment orders for the China-Burma-India Theater (CBI) in February 1943.

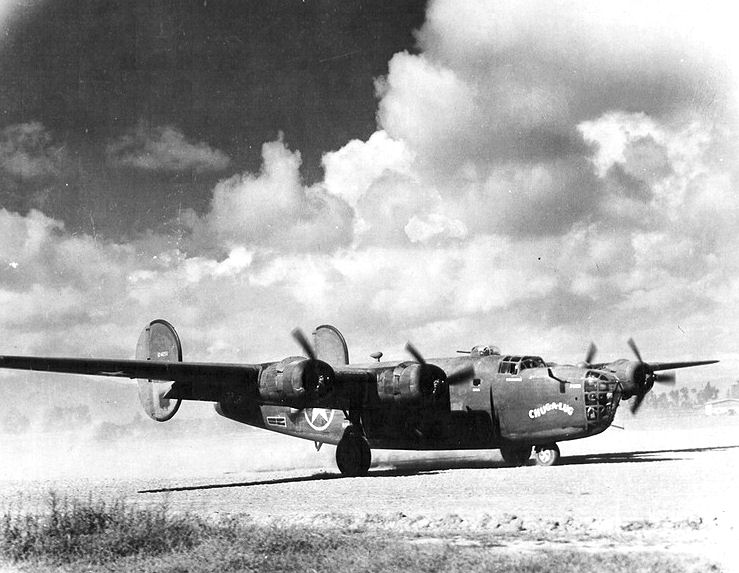
B-24D of the 425th Bombardment Squadron at Kwanghan Airfield (Note: Aircraft is Condsolidated B-24D-25-CO Liberator, serial 41-24251, Chug-A-Lug.)

Deployed to Kunming Airport, China in March 1943, becoming the heavy bombardment arm of the new Fourteenth Air Force. Air echelon deployed to the CBI via the South Atlantic Transport route via Brazil, then across central Africa and Middle East to Karachi, India. Ground echelon traveling by ship across the Pacific via Australia.

Once established in India, group aircraft made many trips over the Himalayan Mountains (The Hump) to Southeastern China from the Assam Valley of India airlifting gasoline, oil, bombs, spare parts, and other items the group needed to prepare for and then to sustain its combat operations. In addition to the B-24 heavy bombers, group utilized C-87 Liberator transports for logistical support.

From its main base at Kunming and later Hsinching Airfield, the 308th carried out long range strategic bombardment of enemy targets in China in support of Chinese ground forces. The group attacked airfields, coalyards, docks, oil refineries, and fuel dumps in French Indochina; mined rivers and ports; bombed shops and docks at Rangoon; attacked Japanese shipping in the East China Sea, Formosa Strait, South China Sea, and Gulf of Tonkin.

Received a Distinguished Unit Citation for an unescorted bombing attack, conducted through antiaircraft fire and fighter defenses, against docks and warehouses at Hankowon 21 August 1943. Received second DUC for interdiction of Japanese shipping during 1944–1945.

Major Horace S. Carswell, Jr. was awarded the Medal of Honor for action on 26 October 1944 when, in spite of intense antiaircraft fire, he attacked a Japanese convoy in the South China Sea; his plane was so badly damaged that when he reached land he ordered the crew to bail out; Carswell, however, remained with the plane to try to save one man who could not jump because his parachute had been ripped by flak; before Carswell could attempt a crash landing, the plane struck a mountainside and burned.

The group moved to India in June 1945. Ferried gasoline and supplies over the Hump. After the Japanese Capitulation in August, the group remained in India in support United States forces in the CBI. Personnel sailed for the United States in December, leaving B-24s to the colonial Indian forces. The unit inactivated as a paper unit in January 1946.

=== Weather reconnaissance ===
"From October 1946 through January 1951, served with Air Weather Service; supervised training and operation of weather reconnaissance units."

=== Strategic Air Command ===
The group was once again designated as a bombardment group and activated on 10 October 1951 at Forbes Air Force Base, Kansas. Under the wing base organization system, it was assigned to the 308th Bombardment Wing. However, Strategic Air Command's mobilization for the Korean War highlighted that wing commanders focused too much on running the base organization and not spending enough time on overseeing actual combat preparations. Under the plan implemented in February 1951 and finalized in June 1952, the wing commander focused primarily on the combat units and the maintenance necessary to support combat aircraft by having the combat and maintenance squadrons report directly to the wing. The group was not operational and its squadrons were attached to the wing until 16 June 1952, when the group was inactivated with final implementation of this organization.

=== Missile development ===
In 2005, the Air Force relocated its Program Executive Offices at Air Force Materiel Command centers. The reorganization was known as the Air Force Materiel Command Transformation. In conjunction with the new organization, the traditional center directorates were replaced by wings and groups. The Long Range Missile Systems Group was formed as one of the new groups at Eglin Air Force Base, Florida in January 2005. In 2006 the 308th was consolidated with this group and the consolidated unit was shortly renamed the 308th Armament Systems Group.

== Lineage ==
308th Bombardment Group

- Established as the 308th Bombardment Group (Heavy) on 28 January 1942

Activated 15 April 1942
Redesignated 308th Bombardment Group, Heavy c. 1944
Inactivated 6 January 1946

- Redesignated 308th Reconnaissance Group, Weather on 27 September 1946

Activated 17 October 1946
Inactivated 5 January 1951

- Redesignated 308th Bombardment Group, Medium on 4 October 1951

Activated 10 October 1951
Inactivated 16 June 1952

- Consolidated with the Long Range Missile Systems Group as the Long Range Missile Systems Group on 3 May 2006

308th Armament Systems Group

- Established as the Long Range Missile Systems Group on 23 November 2004

Activated 27 January 2005

- Consolidated with the 308th Bombardment Group on 3 May 2006

Redesignated 308th Armament Systems Group on 15 May 2006

=== Assignments ===
- Second Air Force, 15 April 1942
- Fourteenth Air Force, 10 March 1943
- United States Forces India-Burma Theater, August–December 1945
- Air Weather Service, 17 October 1946 – 5 January 1951
- 308th Bombardment Wing, 10 October 1951 – 16 January 1952
- Air to Ground Munitions Systems Wing (later 308th Armament Systems Wing), 27 January 2005 – present

=== Components ===
- 36th Reconnaissance Squadron (later 425th Bombardment Squadron): 15 April 1942 – 6 January 1946
- 53d Reconnaissance Squadron: attached 17 October 1946 – 15 October 1947
- 54th Reconnaissance Squadron: 17 October 1946 – 15 October 1947
- 55th Reconnaissance Squadron: 17 October 1946 – 15 October 1947
- 59th Reconnaissance Squadron: attached 17 October 1946 – 15 October 1947
- 373d Bombardment Squadron: 15 April 1942 – 21 July 1945; 10 October 1951 – 16 June 1952 (attached to 308th Bombardment Wing)
- 374th Bombardment Squadron (later 374th Reconnaissance Squadron, 374th Bombardment Squadron): 15 April 1942 – 6 January 1946; 15 October 1947 – 19 December 1950; 10 October 1951 – 16 June 1952 (attached to 308th Bombardment Wing)
- 375th Bombardment Squadron: 15 April 1942 – 6 January 1946; 10 October 1951 – 16 June 1952 (attached to 308th Bombardment Wing)
- 512th Reconnaissance Squadron: 15 October 1947 – 20 September 1948; 13 February-14 November 1949
- 513th Reconnaissance Squadron: 15 October 1947 – 20 September 1948; 10 August 1949 – 19 December 1950
- 2078th Weather Reconnaissance Squadron: 1 June 1948 – 20 March 1950

=== Stations ===
- Gowen Field, Idaho, 15 April 1942
- Davis–Monthan Field, Arizona, 20 June 1942
- Wendover Field, Utah, 1 October–28 November 1942
- Kunming Airport, China, 20 March 1943
- Hsinching Airfield, China, 10 February 1945
- Ruspi Airfield, India, 27 June–15 October 1945
- Camp Kilmer, New Jersey, 5–6 January 1946
- Morrison Field, Florida, 17 October 1946
- Fairfield-Suisun Army Air Field (later Fairfield-Suisun Air Force Base), California, 1 July 1947
- Tinker Air Force Base, Oklahoma, 10 November 1949 – 5 January 1951
- Forbes Air Force Base, Kansas, 10 October 1951
- Hunter Air Force Base, Georgia, 11 April – 16 June 1952
- Eglin Air Force Base, Florida, 27 January 2005 – present

=== Aircraft ===
- Consolidated B-24 Liberator, 1942–1945
- Boeing WB-29 Superfortress, 1946–1951
