= 308th Armament Systems Wing =

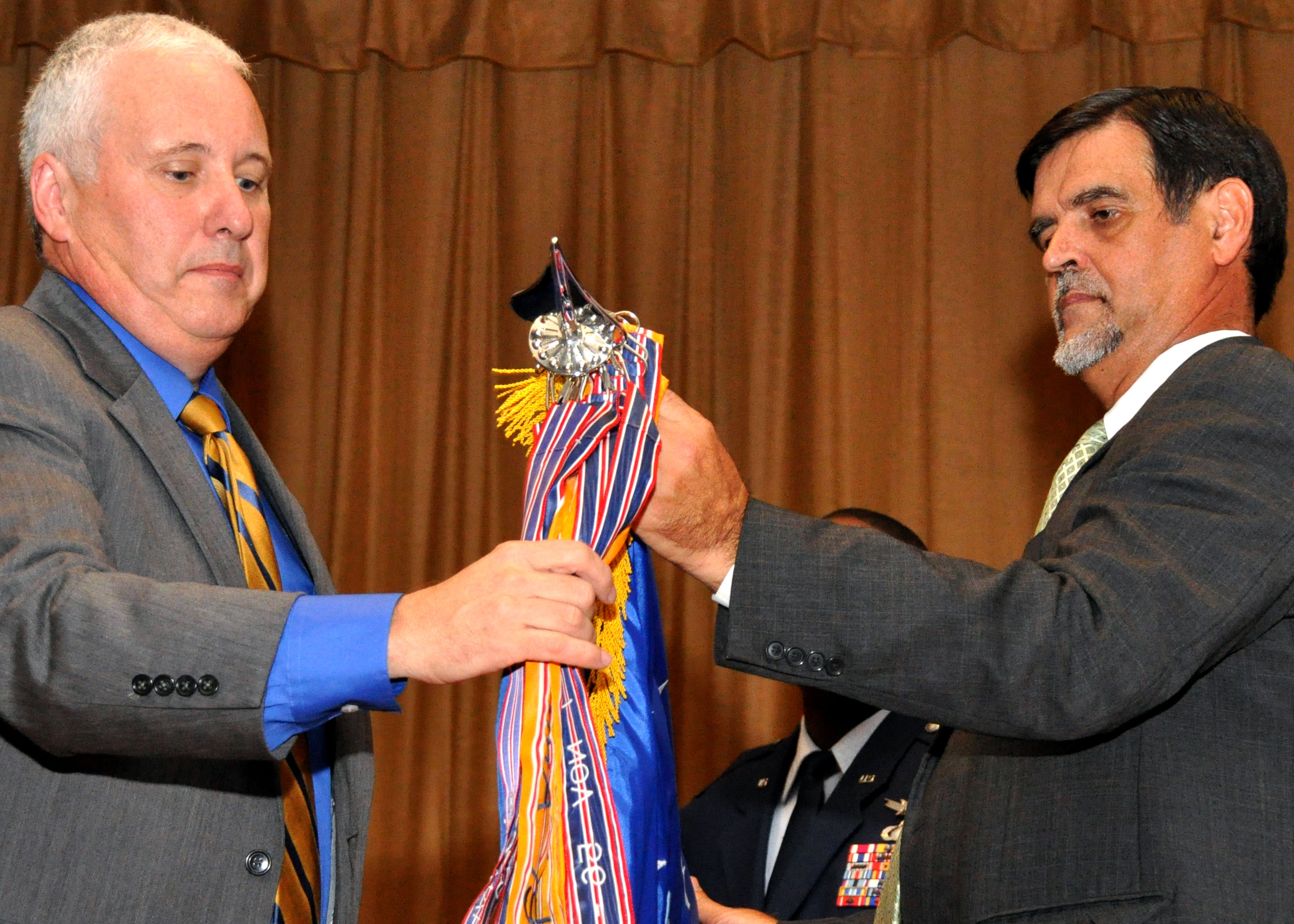
- Dr. Bruce Simpson, Air Armament Center Deputy for Acquisition, helps Randy Brown, 308th Armament Systems Wing Director, roll up the guidon for the 308th Armament Systems Wing, 30 July 2010, at Eglin Air Force Base, Florida.
- Active: 1951–1961, 1962–1987, 2006–2010
- Country: United States
- Branch: United States Air Force
- Role: Armament test and evaluation
- Garrison/HQ: Eglin AFB, Florida
- Mottos: Non Sibi Sed Aliis (Latin for 'Not for Self, But for others.')
- Engagements: World War II; Cold War
- Decorations: Distinguished Unit Citation; Air Force Outstanding Unit Award

Insignia
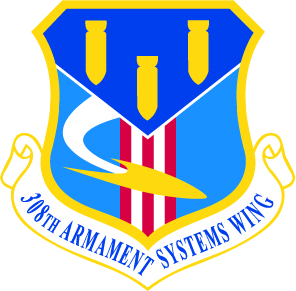
- 308th Armament Systems Wing emblem (Note: Approved 22 August 2006)

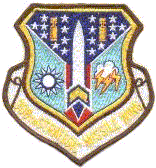
- Patch with 308th Strategic Missile Wing emblem (Note: Approved 28 February 1963. Description: Light blue, a pale gules fimbriated argent between in fess abased a mullet of twelve points bearing a hurt voided of the third [color mentioned] and a cloud formation of the last [color mentioned] emitting three lightning flashes to base or, on a chief per chevron inverted of the fourth fimbriated of the third [color mentioned] two bombs or between 18 mullets, four, six, four, two, and two, of the last [color mentioned] finned of the fifth [color mentioned] emitting a vapor trail to base of the fourth [color mentioned], all within a diminished bordure of the fifth [color mentioned] fimbriated of the fourth [color mentioned].)

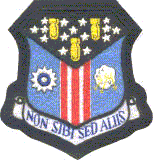
- Patch with 308th Bombardment Wing emblem (Note: Approved 29 August 1952. Description: Azure, between a plate argent thereon three per pallets gules, on the dexter a star of twelve points white, charged with an annulet azure; on the sinister a thundercloud proper with three lightning flashes or; in chief per chevron inverted and enhanced sable, three bombs points downward or, between a Semeé of fifteen stars argent.)

The 308th Armament Systems Wing was a United States Air Force unit established in 1951, being activated and inactivated at different times in history. It was last assigned to the Air Armament Center, stationed at Eglin Air Force Base, Florida. It was inactivated on 30 July 2010.

== History ==
For related lineage and history, see 308th Armament Systems Group

=== Strategic Bombardment ===
In 1951, the 308th was activated as a bombardment unit at Hunter Air Force Base, Savannah, Georgia, and initially equipped with Boeing B-29 Superfortresses. Those aircraft were then replaced with new Boeing B-47E Stratojet swept-wing medium jet bombers in 1954, capable of flying at high subsonic speeds and primarily designed for penetrating the airspace of the Soviet Union. Also received Boeing KC-97 Stratofreighter tankers. Over the next eight years, the 308th conducted strategic bombardment training and air refueling to meet Strategic Air Command's global commitments.

Deployed to bases in North Africa three times, twice in detachment form and once as a unit Sidi Slimane Air Base Morocco, 21 August – 26 October 1956. From November 1956 to March 1957, the wing tested the Strategic Air Command alert plan by maintaining one-third of its bomber and tanker force on continuous alert.

The wing was broken up in mid July 1959, for unclear reasons. Part of the unit went to the 2nd Bombardment Wing at Hunter Air Force Base, Georgia. The bulk of the wing moved to Plattsburgh Air Force Base, New York on 15 July 1959, where its aircraft were placed under the control of the 380th Bombardment Wing. The wing was not operational as one formation from July 1959 to June 1961.

=== Intercontinental Ballistic Missiles ===
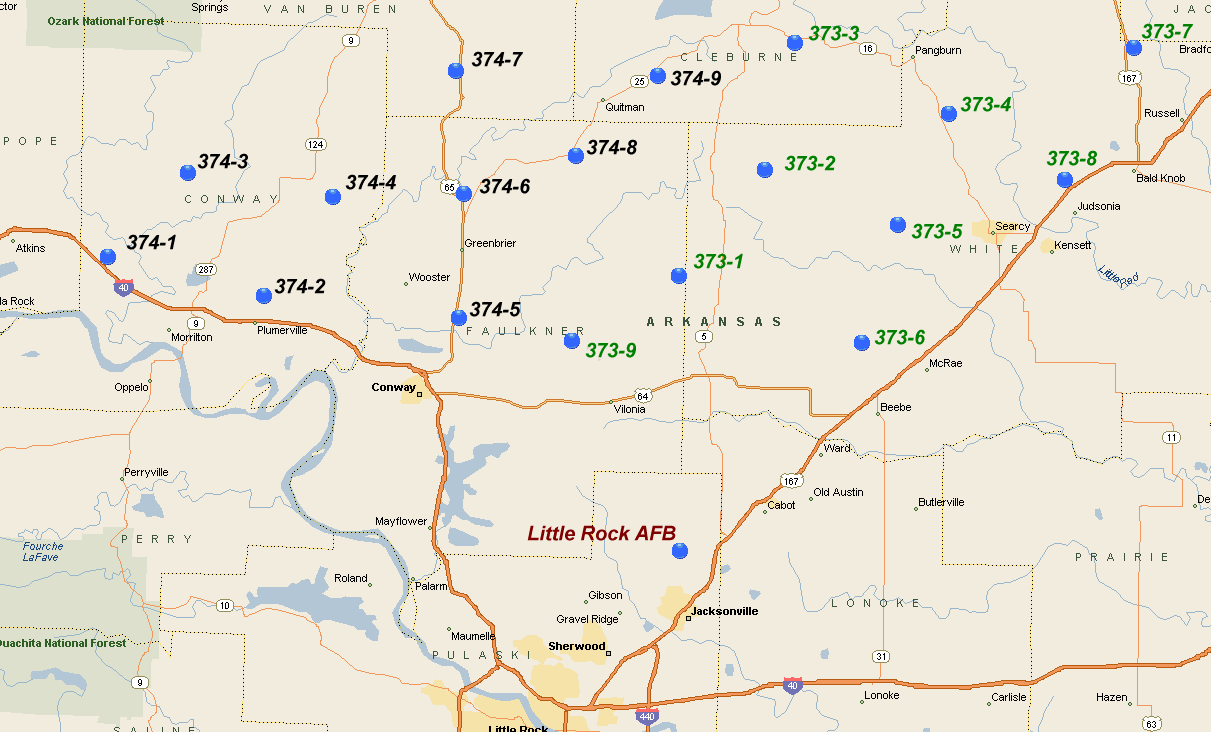
308th Wing Titan II Missile Sites

The wing was redesignated and activated on 20 November 1961 as the 308th Strategic Missile Wing with Charles Peter O'Sullivan as the first commander. In early 1962 the Air Force established 18 LGM-25C Titan II launch sites at Strategic Air Command's Little Rock Air Force Base, Arkansas. The 308th was reactivated, being organized on 1 April 1962. The wing became fully operational with eighteen sites in December 1963. It gained control over its first missile complex in August 1962 and became fully operational with 18 sites in December 1963. In October 1981, US President Ronald Reagan announced that all Titan II sites would be deactivated by 1 October 1987, as part of a strategic modernization program. The wing completed inactivation on 18 August 1987.

=== 308th Armament Systems Wing ===
On 23 November 2004 the Air to Ground Munitions Systems Wing was established at Eglin Air Force Base, Florida. It was tasked to design, develop, field and maintain a family of air-to-ground munitions that enhanced United States armed forces strike capabilities. The wing was activated on 27 January 2005. On 3 May 2006 the wing was consolidated with the 308th Wing, and the resulting formation was redesignated the 308th Armament Systems Wing on 15 May 2006.

The wing was activated in 2004 to design, develop, field and maintain a family of air-to-ground munitions that enhance warfighter strike capabilities.

The mission of the 308th Armament Systems Wing was to enhance worldwide Air Force combat capability, effectiveness, aircrew survivability, and readiness through joint development, procurement, deployment and sustainment. This mission is executed by air combat test and training systems, expeditionary support equipment, munitions handling equipment and armament subsystems, Explosive Ordnance Disposal support equipment, and realistic Electronic Warfare threat simulators.

The 308th designed, developed, produced, fielded, and sustained a family of air-to-ground and air-to-air munitions, enhancing warfighter capabilities (both U.S. and allies) in defeating a spectrum of enemy targets.

The 308th was a critical component of the Air Armament Center, which covers the complete weapon-system life-cycle from concept through development, acquisition, experimental testing, procurement, operational testing and final employment in combat.

The wing consisted of over 400 highly qualified personnel trained in the development, test, acquisition, fielding, and operational support of systems such as the Joint Direct Attack Munition, Joint Air-to-Surface Standoff Missile, Small Diameter Bomb, Sensor Fused Weapon, Wind Corrected Munitions Dispenser and a host of other specialized programs.

The wing was inactivated on 30 June 2010 and became a directorate to comply with Air Force 2008–2010 Strategic Plan and the CSAF's directive to implement guidelines for new personnel strength standards for units across the Air Force.

=== Lineage ===
- Established as the 308th Bombardment Wing, Medium on 4 October 1951

Activated on 10 October 1951
Inactivated 25 June 1961

- Redesignated 308th Strategic Missile Wing (ICBM-Titan) and activated, on 29 November 1961 (not organized)

Organized on 1 April 1962
Inactivated 18 August 1987
Consolidated with the Air to Ground Munitions Systems Wing as the Air to Ground Munitions Systems Wing on 3 May 2006

- Established as Air to Ground Munitions Systems Wing on 23 November 2004

Activated on 27 January 2005
Consolidated with the 308th Strategic Missile Wing on 3 May 2006
Redesignated: 308th Armament Systems Wing on 15 May 2006
Inactivated on 30 June 2010

=== Assignments ===
- 38th Air Division, 10 October 1951 (attached to 21st Air Division, 10 October 1951 – 17 April 1952; 5th Air Division, 21 August-c. 26 October 1956)
- 820th Air Division, 15 July 1959 – 25 June 1961
- Strategic Air Command, 29 November 1961 (not organized)
- 825th Air Division (later 825th Strategic Aerospace Division), 1 April 1962
- 42d Air Division, 1 January 1970
- 17th Strategic Aerospace Division, 31 March 1970
- 12th Strategic Missile Division (later 12 Air Division), 30 June 1971
- 42nd Air Division, 1 April 1973
- 19th Air Division, 1 December 1982 – 18 August 1987
- Air Armament Center, 27 January 2005 – 30 June 2010

=== Components ===
Groups

- 308th Bombardment Group: 10 October 1951 – 16 June 1952 (not operational)
- 308th Armament Systems Group: 27 January 2005 – 30 June 2010
- 328th Armament Systems Group: 7 September 2007 – 30 June 2010
- 408th Armament Systems Group: 27 January 2005 – 30 June 2010
- 708th Armament Systems Group: 27 January 2005 – 30 June 2010
- 728th Armament Systems Group: 7 September 2007 – 30 June 2010
- 918th Armament Systems Group: 2006-2010

Squadrons

- 303d Air Refueling Squadron: attached 1 February 1956 – 15 July 1959
- 308th Air Refueling Squadron: 8 July 1953 – 15 June 1959 (detached 1–21 June 1954, 5 January-4 March 1956, and 2 April-2 July 1958)
- 373d Bombardment Squadron (later 373d Strategic Missile Squadron): attached 10 October 1951 – 15 June 1952 (not operational until 5 November 1951), assigned 16 June 1952 – 25 June 1961 (not operational after 15 July 1959); assigned 1 April 1962 – 18 August 1987
- 374th Bombardment Squadron (later 374th Strategic Missile Squadron): attached 10 October 1951 – 15 June 1952 (not operational until 5 November 1951), assigned 16 June 1952 – 25 June 1961 (not operational after 15 July 1959); assigned 1 September 1962 – 15 August 1986
- 375th Bombardment Squadron: attached 10 October 1951 – 15 June 1952 (not operational until 13 November 1951), assigned 16 June 1952 – 25 June 1961 (not operational after 15 July 1959)
- 425th Bombardment Squadron: 1 October 1958 – 25 June 1961 (not operational after 15 July 1959).

=== Stations ===
- Forbes Air Force Base, Kansas, 10 October 1951
- Hunter Air Force Base, Georgia, 17 April 1952
- Plattsburgh Air Force Base, New York, 15 July 1959 – 25 June 1961
- Little Rock Air Force Base, Arkansas, 1 April 1962 – 18 August 1987
- Eglin Air Force Base, Florida, 27 January 2005 – 30 June 2010

=== Aircraft and Missiles ===
- Boeing B-29 Superfortress, 1946–1951, 1951–1953
- Boeing B-47 Stratojet, 1953–1954, 1954–1959
- Boeing KC-97 Stratofreighter, 1953–1959
- LGM-25C Titan II, 1963–1987

== See also ==
- List of B-47 units of the United States Air Force
