= Titan II ICBM Launch Complex 373-5 Site =

- U.S. National Register of Historic Places
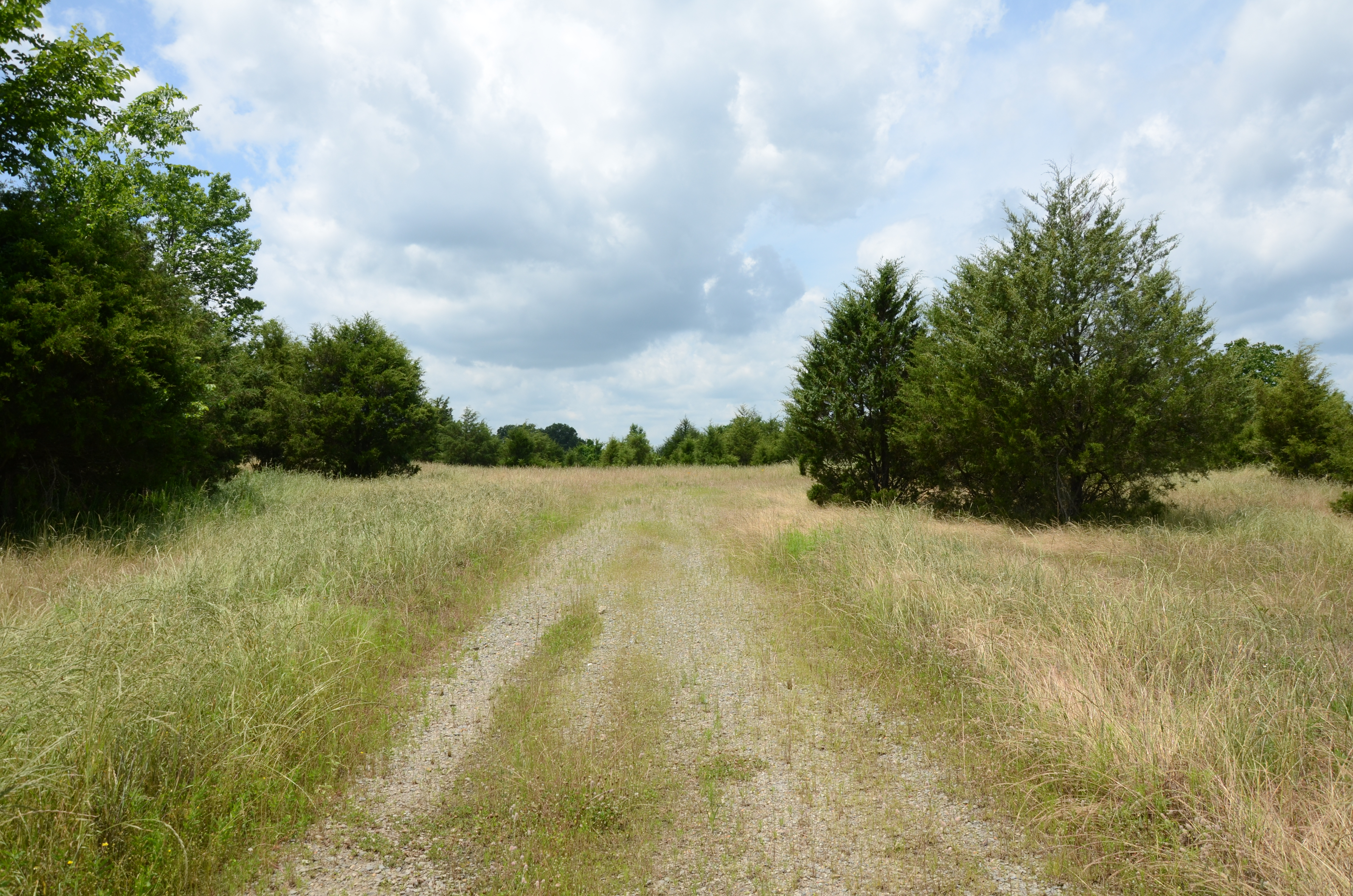

- Location within Arkansas Location within the United States
- Nearest city: Center Hill, Arkansas
- Coordinates: 35°15′34″N 91°51′26″W
- Area: 23 acres (9.3 ha)
- Built: 1963
- Built by: U.S. Army Corps of Engineers; Parsons, Ralph M. Co.
- MPS: Cold War Resources Associated with the 308th Strategic Missile Wing in Arkansas MPS
- NRHP reference No.: 00000100
- Added to NRHP: 6 March 2000

The Titan II ICBM Launch Complex 373-5 Site is a historic military installation in White County, Arkansas. It is located on private property just northeast of the junction of Arkansas Highways 35 and 320, west of Searcy. The 23-acre (9.3 ha) site has only a few surface-level features remaining, including its access road (off Highway 36) and a helicopter landing pad. Most of the site's surviving features are below ground, including a three-level command complex, but are discernible by the mounding of earth over their remains. The site housed a Titan II missile, and was in service from 1962 until 1986. Its control equipment was then removed, and many of its surface-level features (including the launch portal and main personnel access portal) were demolished and covered with mounded earth. When operational, the site was operated by the 373d Strategic Missile Squadron of the United States Air Force.

The site was listed on the National Register of Historic Places in 2000.

== See also ==
- Titan II ICBM Launch Complex 374-5 Site
- Titan II ICBM Launch Complex 374-7 Site
- National Register of Historic Places listings in White County, Arkansas
