= Chengkung Airfield =

World War II US airfield in China

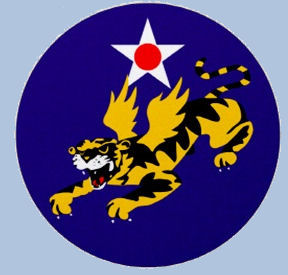
Chengkung Airfield
- Part of Fourteenth Air Force
- Chenggong County, Yunnan, Republic of China

Site information
- Type: Military Airfield
- Controlled by: United States Army Air Forces

Location
- Location within China
- Coordinates: 24.878628°N 102.822839°E

Site history
- Battles/wars: China Defensive Campaign 1942-1945

Chengkung Airfield (Chinese: 呈贡机场; pinyin: Chénggòng Jīchǎng), also known by the modern romanization Chenggong Airfield, was a military airfield in Chenggong County, Yunnan, China. During the Second Sino-Japanese War and World War II, it was used by the United States Army Air Forces for bomber, fighter, maintenance, and transport operations, including flights associated with the Hump air route.

United States operations ended after World War II, the site was partially dismantled or converted into agricultural land, while parts of the airfield remained military property and retained an aviation function into the 2010s. A nearby primary school was later given the honorary title "Kunming Flying Tigers Primary School" (Chinese: 昆明飞虎小学), but the school does not occupy the airfield site as a whole.

== History ==
=== WWII ===
Chengkung was constructed as part of the wartime expansion of military aviation facilities around Kunming. Local laborers built and maintained the runways using hand-carved stone rollers, some weighing several tones. The airfield handled fighters, bombers and transport aircraft operating across the Himalayas.

Construction of the airfield began in November 1942, with the airfield opening on 27 January 1943. Chengkung was a major terminal for "the Hump" trans-Himalayan transport aircraft between India and China for Tenth Air Force and Air Transport Command C-47 Skytrain and C-46 Commando aircraft. In addition, Air Technical Service Command maintained a maintenance and supply facility as the 68th Air Service Group at the base to support the airlift operations over the Himalayas.

In addition to the transport mission, Chengkung was used by the 374th and 375th Bombardment Squadrons, flying B-24 Liberator heavy bombers from the field beginning in March 1943. The 23rd Fighter Group and 76th Fighter Squadron staged P-51 Mustang fighters from the field beginning in October 1943. Also the 16th Fighter Squadron, with P-40 Warhawks arrived in October. Photo-reconnaissance aircraft used Chengkung throughout the war, flying combat intelligence missions over Japanese-held territory until the end of the war when the United States Army Air Forces withdrew from Chengkung.

== Later use ==
The airfield subsequently remained under Chinese military control. A 2015 public-transfer prospectus issued by Yunnan Harmony General Aviation (Chinese: 云南和谐通用航空股份有限公司) stated that the company used Kunming Chenggong Airfield as its base airport under an agreement signed with a military unit on May 9, 2014 for the use of the Simao and Chenggong air bases. The agreement expired on May 10, 2015, and the company stated that it might have to relocate its base if the military reclaimed the leased airport.

As Chenggong developed into a major urban district, the remaining military enclave became surrounded by civilian development and interrupted two planned arterial roads, Gudian Road (Chinese: 古滇路) and Lianda Street (Chinese: 联大街). Gudian Road was intended to form a major north-south corridor through the district, while Lianda Street forms one of its principal east-west routes; both remain discontinuous where they meet the military land. Although local authorities announced a preliminary land-exchange plan involving the military unit and an adjacent provincial sport training center, the proposal had not resulted in either road being completed through the enclaves as of August 2026.

== Legacy ==
Chenggong District No. 1 Primary School (呈贡区第一小学) is located near the former airfield. In September 2015, the Yunnan Flying Tigers Research Association (云南省飞虎队研究会) granted the school the honorary title "Kunming Flying Tigers Primary School" in recognition of the area's wartime aviation history. A plaque-unveiling ceremony was held at the school's Huijingyuan campus on June 12, 2017 and was attended by Raymond Greene, the Consulate General of the United States at Chengdu. The school has incorporated the history of the airfield into its educational program and campus displays, including exhibitions of wartime photographs and replicas of the stone rollers used to construct and maintain the airfield.

== See also ==
- Kunming Wujiaba International Airport
- The Hump
- Fourteenth Air Force
