= 373d Strategic Missile Squadron =

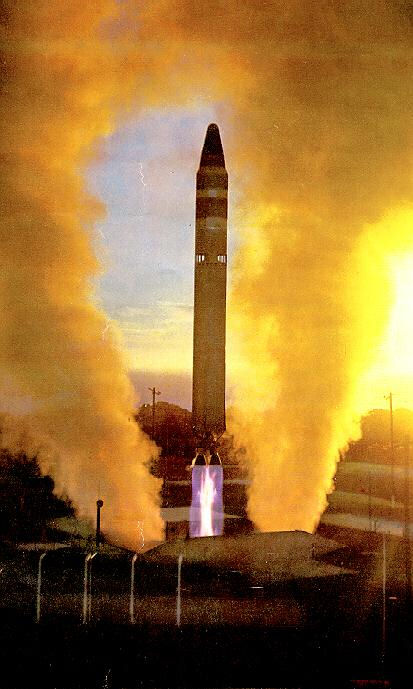
- LGM-25C Titan II test launch at Vandenberg AFB, California
- Active: 1942–1946; 1947–1951; 1951–1961; 1962–1987
- Country: United States
- Branch: United States Air Force
- Type: Squadron
- Role: Intercontinental ballistic missile
- Engagements: China-Burma-India Theater
- Decorations: Distinguished Unit Citation; Air Force Outstanding Unit Award

Insignia
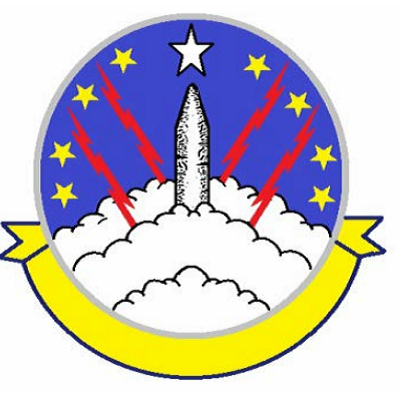
- 373d Strategic Missile Squadron emblem (Note: Approved 2 July 1963. Description: On a blue disc edged white, a vertical gray missile between four red lightning flashes, two and two, all emerging from a cloud (thunderhead) issuing from base and outlined blue beneath an arc of nine stars, four yellow, one white, four yellow, the white star larger than the equally-sized yellow stars. Below the disc on a yellow scroll, the motto in blue letters. Significance: The squadron's mission is indicated by the missile emerging from a cloud, the lightning flashes signifying constant readiness and instantaneous striking power, and the nine stars referring to the nine missile complexes of the squadron.)

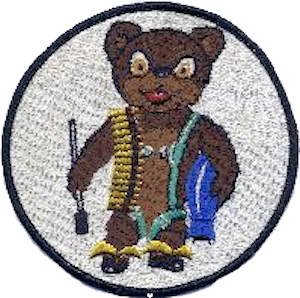
- Patch with 373d Bombardment Squadron emblem (Note: Approved 19 May 1953. Description: A brown bear, front view, wearing brown flight boots and green parachute harness with white buckles and carrying a black bomb in his right paw, a blue aerial bomb in his left and cartridge-belt over his right shoulder; all on a white disc.)

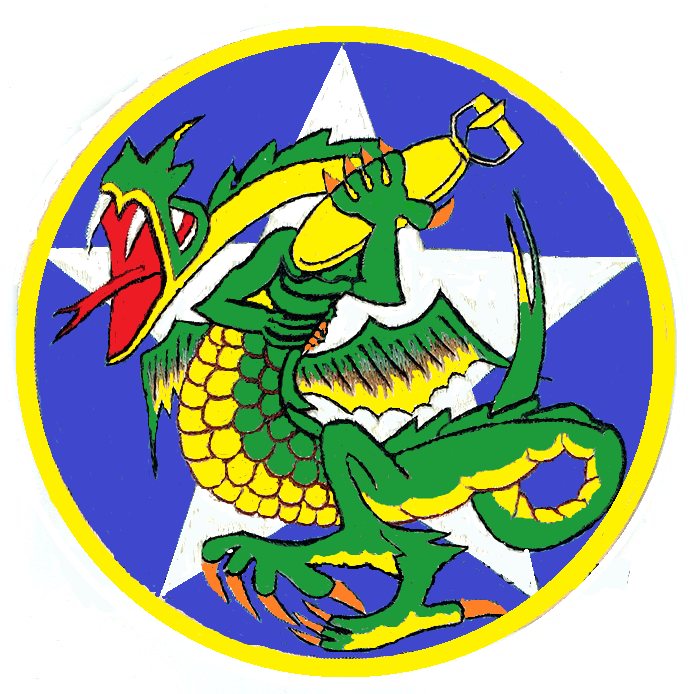
- 373d Bombardment Squadron emblem (World War II)

The 373d Strategic Missile Squadron is an inactive United States Air Force unit that was last assigned to the 308th Strategic Missile Wing at Little Rock Air Force Base, Arkansas. The 373rd was equipped with the LGM-25C Titan II Intercontinental ballistic missile in 1962, with a mission of nuclear deterrence. The squadron was inactivated for the last time as part of the phaseout of the Titan II ICBM on 18 August 1987.

The squadron was first activated in April 1942 as the 373d Bombardment Squadron. After training in the United States, the squadron deployed to China in early 1943. It engaged in combat, primarily in China and Southeast Asia until June 1945, when it assumed a mainly transport role. It was awarded a Distinguished Unit Citation for its attacks on Japanese shipping. At the end of 1945 it returned to the United States for inactivation.

The squadron was redesignated the 373d Reconnaissance Squadron and activated in Bermuda in 1947, assuming the personnel of another unit. It transferred its personnel and equipment itself when it was inactivated in 1949. It returned to its bombardment mission in 1951 and operated Boeing B-47 Stratojets for Strategic Air Command. In 1959 it moved as part of a test of a "super wing" concept, but was not operational until in inactivated in 1961.

== History ==
=== World War II ===
==== Initial organization and training ====
The squadron was activated at Gowen Field, Idaho on 15 April 1942 as the 373d Bombardment Squadron, one of the four original squadrons of the 308th Bombardment Group. As the squadron was forming and beginning its training in Consolidated B-24 Liberators, at Alamogordo Army Air Field, New Mexico in August 1942, almost all its personnel were transferred to the 330th Bombardment Group.

The following month, a fresh cadre taken from the 39th Bombardment Group joined the group. In addition to its own training activities, at the beginning of October, the unit was briefly designated as an Operational Training Unit The squadron began its movement to the China Burma India Theater in January 1943. The air echelon ferried its Liberators across the Atlantic and Africa, leaving from Morrison Field, while the ground echelon moved by ship across the Pacific.

==== Combat operations ====
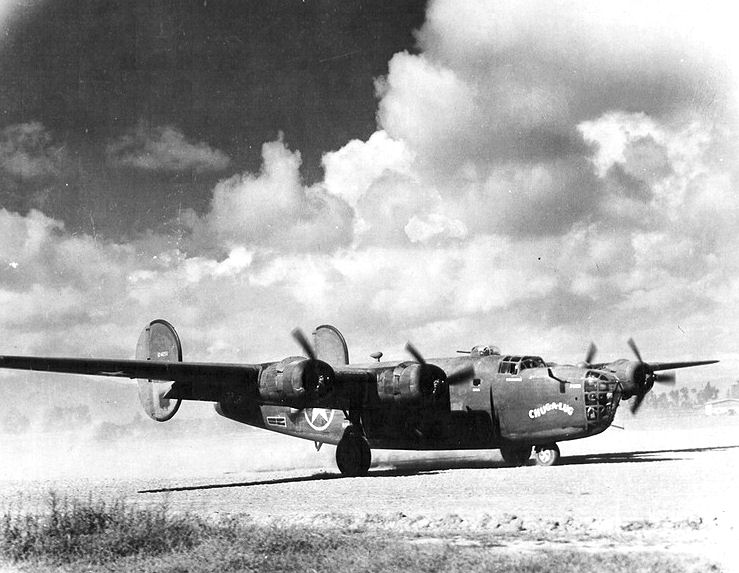
308th Bombardment Group B-24D Liberator at Kwanghan Airfield, China (Note: Aircraft is Consolidated B-24D-25-CO Liberator, serial 41-24251, Chug-A-Lug.)

In late March 1943, the squadron arrived at Kunming Airport, China. In order to prepare for and sustain combat operations in China, the squadron had to conduct numerous flights over the Hump transporting gasoline, lubricants, ordnance, spare parts and the other items it needed. The 373d supported Chinese ground forces and attacked airfields, coal yards, docks, oil refineries and fuel dumps in French Indochina. It attacked shipping, mined rivers and ports and bombed maintenance shops and docks at Rangoon, Burma and attacked Japanese shipping in the East China Sea, Formosa Straits, South China Sea and Gulf of Tonkin. For its operations interdicting Japanese shipping it was awarded a Distinguished Unit Citation.

On 15 September 1943, seven squadron B-24s, based at Yangkai Airfield, were dispatched to attack a cement plant in Haiphong, a major port on the Gulf of Tonkin, but only one survived the mission. Two B-24s broke down while attempting to take off. The five remaining planes continued the mission. Over Haiphong, they were attacked by Japanese fighters. One plane went down, forcing the other planes to abandon the mission as they were continuously attacked. After that, two more planes were shot down. The Japanese pilots then attacked the parachuting aircrew, killing three and wounding three others. The other two planes escaped severe damage and returned to Yangkai Airfield, but one crashed at the airfield, killing the entire crew.

The squadron moved to Okinawa in June 1945, where it was assigned to the 494th Bombardment Group. With the 494th, the squadron operated black camouflaged B-24s equipped with H2X radar. From its base at Yontan Airfield it engaged primarily in attacks against enemy airfields on Kyūshū and around the Inland Sea of Japan until V-J Day. It also struck airfields in China and Korea. The unit participated in incendiary raids and dropped propaganda leaflets over urban areas of Kyūshū. It also conducted weather reconnaissance missions. After the war's end, the unit transported personnel and supplies from Manila to Tokyo. In December, the 373d returned to the United States, where it was inactivated at the Vancouver Barracks Port of Embarkation on 6 January 1946.

=== Weather reconnaissance ===
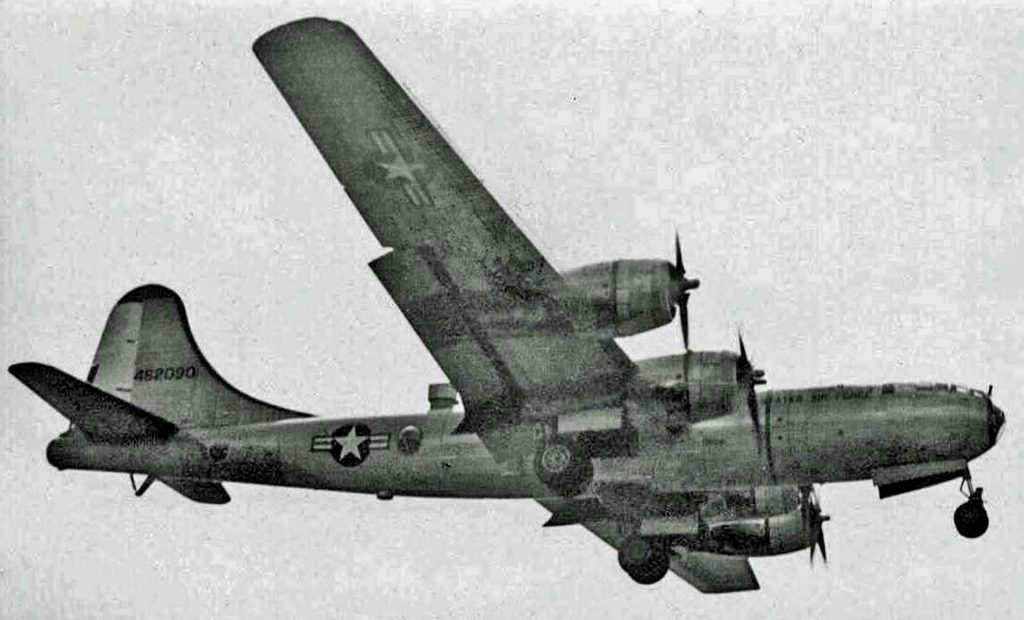
Boeing WB-29A

The squadron was reactivated at Kindley Field, Bermuda on 15 October 1947 as the 373d Reconnaissance Squadron, an Air Weather Service weather reconnaissance squadron, assuming the personnel and Boeing B-29 Superfortresses of the 53d Reconnaissance Squadron, which was simultaneously inactivated. The squadron performed weather reconnaissance, including monitoring areas of the Atlantic for developing hurricanes until it was inactivated in February 1951 and its personnel and equipment transferred to the 53d Strategic Reconnaissance Squadron.

=== Strategic Air Command ===
==== Bomber operations ====
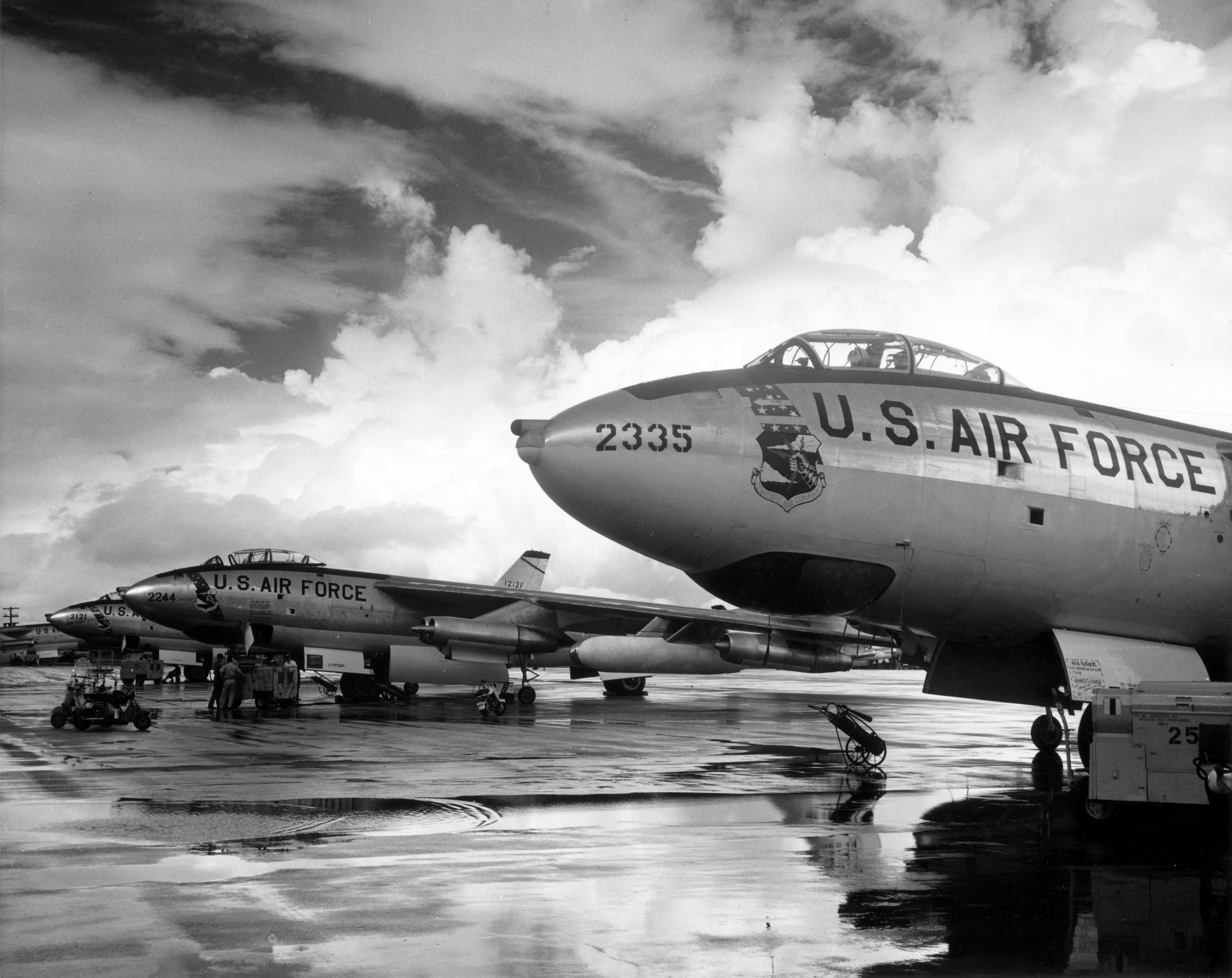
Strategic Air Command B-47 Stratojets as flown by the squadron

In October 1951, the squadron was activated, again as the 373rd Bombardment Squadron, at Forbes Air Force Base, Kansas, but did not become operational until 10 November with B-29 Superfortress bombers. Although assigned to the 308th Bombardment Group, the group was a paper organization and the squadron was attached to other organizations until June 1952, (Note: Maurer indicates the squadron was attached to the 21st Air Division while stationed at Forbes. Ravenstein gives attachment to the 308th Bombardment Wing at both Forbes and Hunter.) when the group inactivated and the 373d was assigned directly to the 308th Bombardment Wing.

In April 1952, the squadron moved to Hunter Air Force Base, Georgia, and in 1953 began to equip with Boeing B-47 Stratojets. The squadron detached forces to bases in North Africa, and from 21 August until late October 1956, deployed with the entire 308th Wing to Sidi Slimane Air Base, Morocco. Overseas Operation Reflex alert operations began in October 1957. Reflex placed Stratojets and Boeing KC-97 Stratofreighters at bases closer to the Soviet Union for 90 day periods, although individuals rotated back to home bases during unit Reflex deployments.

As the Soviet Union built up its strategic bomber force in the 1950s, defense planners studied ways to defend against a surprise attack. Strategic Air Command (SAC) proposed keeping its bombers and supporting tankers on ground alert with weapons loaded and crews ready for takeoff. General Thomas S. Power, the commander of SAC, announced a goal of maintaining one third of SAC’s planes on fifteen minute ground alert, fully fueled and ready for combat. From November 1956 to October 1957, the squadron participated in Operation Try Out to test the feasibility of the alert concept. Following two additional tests, the plan was implemented, reducing the amount of time the squadron spent on alert at overseas bases.

In July 1959 SAC began a test of a "super wing" at Hunter. In this test, all B-47s at Hunter were transferred to the 2d Bombardment Wing and the squadron, along with other elements of the 308th Wing, became nonoperational. The squadron continued in this status until it was inactivated on 25 June 1961.

==== Intercontinental ballistic missile operations ====
In 1962, the squadron was reactivated and redesignated as the 373d Strategic Missile Squadron, a SAC LGM-25C Titan II intercontinental ballistic missile strategic missile squadron. It operated nine Titan II underground silos whose construction began in 1960; the first site (373-5) was operationally ready on 15 June 1963. The 9 missile silos controlled by the 373d Strategic Missile Squadron remained on alert for over 20 years during the Cold War. On 8 August 1965, at launch site 373-4, 53 contractor workers died in a flash fire while installing modifications to the launch silo, which had been originally built to house a Titan I missile. The cause of the accident was believed to be a rupture in a high-pressure line, which spewed hydraulic fluid on the floor. Ignited by sparks from a nearby welder, the resulting fire consumed most of the oxygen in the space, suffocating the workers.

The squadron operated nine missile sites:

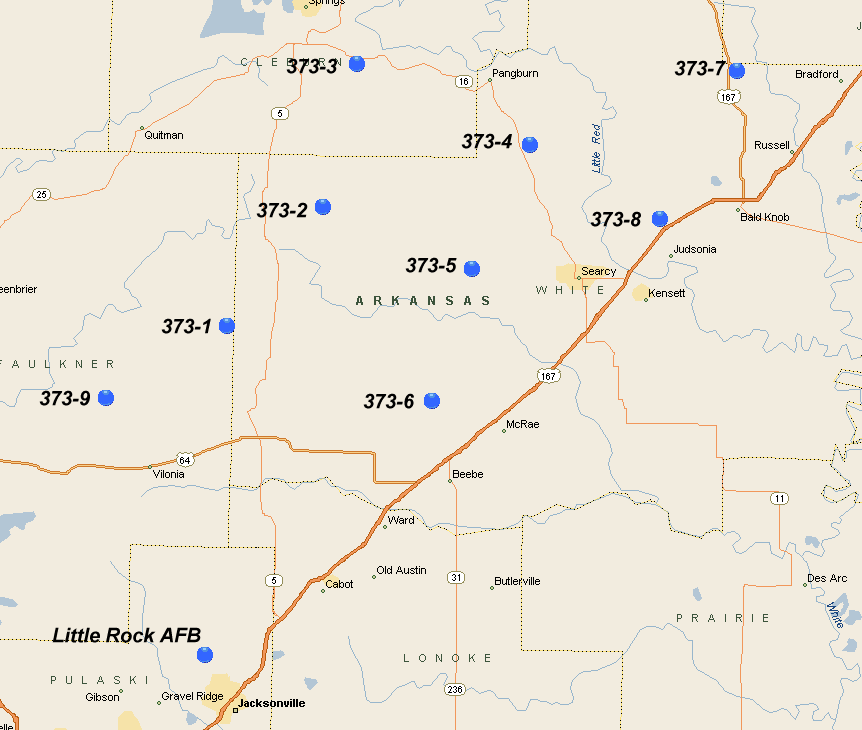
LGM-25C Titan II Sites

373-1 (15 Nov 1963 – 5 January 1987), 1.2 mi S of Mount Vernon, AR 35°12′34″N 092°07′27″W
373-2 (29 Nov 1963 – 4 May 1987), 3.7 mi E of Rose Bud, AR 35°18′54″N 092°01′09″W
373-3 (19 Oct 1963 – 18 March 1987), 4.4 mi SE of Heber Springs, AR 35°26′31″N 091°58′57″W
373-4 (16 May 1963 – 18 February 1987)*, 2.1 mi ENE of Letona, AR 35°22′14″N 091°47′39″W
373-5 (15 Jun 1963 – 20 October 1986), 1.5 mi E of Center Hill, AR 35°15′38″N 091°51′25″W
373-6 (23 Nov 1963 – 20 June 1985), 4.9 mi WNW of McRae, AR 35°08′33″N 091°54′03″W
373-7 (26 Jun 1963 – 3 April 1986), 6.1 mi W of Russell, AR 35°26′08″N 091°34′05″W
373-8 (18 Dec 1963 – 20 October 1986), 2.5 mi NNW of Judsonia, AR 35°18′15″N 091°39′08″W
373-9 (28 Oct 1963 – 3 October 1985), 2.1 mi SSE of Holland, AR 35°08′41″N 092°15′17″W

In October 1981, President Ronald Reagan announced that as part of the strategic modernization program, Titan II systems were to be retired by 1 October 1987. Inactivation of the sites began when site 373-6 was shut down on 20 June 1985. Site 373–8 was taken off alert on 5 May 1987, ending 24 years of alert with Titan II missiles. The squadron was inactivated on 18 August.

=== Disposition of missile sites ===
After removal from service, the silos had reusable equipment removed by Air Force personnel, and contractors retrieved salvageable metals before destroying the silos with explosives and filling them in. Access to the vacated control centers was blocked off. Missile sites were later sold off to private ownership after demilitarization. Today, the remains of the sites are still visible in aerial imagery, in various states of use or abandonment. Titan II ICBM Launch Complex 373-5 Site was listed on the National Register of Historic Places in 2000.

== Lineage ==
- Constituted 373d Bombardment Squadron (Heavy) on 28 January 1942

Activated on 15 April 1942

- Redesignated 373d Bombardment Squadron, Heavy c. 1944

Inactivated on 7 January 1946

- Redesignated: 373d Reconnaissance Squadron, Very Long Range, Weather on 16 September 1947.

Activated on 15 October 1947
Inactivated on 21 February 1951

- Redesignated 373d Bombardment Squadron, Medium on 4 October 1951

Activated on 10 October 1951
Discontinued and inactivated on 25 June 1961

- Redesignated 373d Strategic Missile Squadron (ICBM-Titan) and activated on 29 November 1961 (not organized)

Organized on 1 April 1962
Inactivated on 18 August 1987

=== Assignments ===
- 308th Bombardment Group, 15 April 1942
- 494th Bombardment Group, 21 July 1945
- 11th Bombardment Group, 11 October 1945 – 7 January 1946
- 8th Weather Group (later 2108th Air Weather Group), 15 October 1947 – 21 February 1951
- 308th Bombardment Group, 10 October 1951 (attached to 21st Air Division until 17 April 1952, then to 308th Bombardment Wing)
- 308th Bombardment Wing, 16 June 1952 – 25 June 1961
- Strategic Air Command, 29 November 1961 (not organized)
- 308th Strategic Missile Wing, 1 April 1962 – 18 August 1987

=== Stations ===
- Gowen Field, Idaho, 15 April 1942
- Davis–Monthan Field, Arizona, 20 June 1942
- Alamogordo Army Air Field, New Mexico, 23 July 1942
- Davis–Monthan Field, Arizona, 28 August 1942
- Wendover Field, Utah, 1 October 1942
- Pueblo Army Air Base, Colorado, 30 November 1942 – 2 January 1943
- Yangkai Airfield, China, 20 March 1943
- Luliang Air Base, China, 14 September 1944
- Yontan Airfield, Okinawa, 21 July – 19 December 1945
- Vancouver Barracks, Washington, 4–7 January 1946
- Kindley Field (later Kindley Air Force Base), Bermuda, 15 October 1947 – 21 February 1951
- Forbes Air Force Base, Kansas, 10 October 1951
- Hunter Air Force Base, Georgia, 17 April 1952
- Plattsburgh Air Force Base, New York, 15 July 1959 – 25 June 1961
- Little Rock Air Force Base, Arkansas, 1 April 1962 – 18 August 1987

=== Aircraft and missiles ===
- Douglas B-18 Bolo, 1942
- Consolidated B-24 Liberator, 1942–1945
- Boeing TB-17 Flying Fortress, 1947–1948
- Boeing RB-29 Superfortress, 1947–1951
- Boeing B-29 Superfortress, 1947–1951, 1951–1953
- Boeing WB-29 Superfortress, 1947–1951
- Boeing B-47 Stratojet, 1954–1959
- LGM-25C Titan II, 1962–1987

=== Awards and campaigns ===
| Award streamer | Award | Dates | Notes |
|---|---|---|---|
| | Distinguished Unit Citation | 24 May 1944–28 April 1945 | East and South China Seas, Straits of Formosa and Gulf of Tonkin, 373d Bombardment Squadron |
| | Air Force Outstanding Unit Award | 1 November 1956–1 April 1957 | 373d Bombardment Squadron |
| | Air Force Outstanding Unit Award | 1 July 1967–30 June 1968 | 373d Strategic Missile Squadron |
| | Air Force Outstanding Unit Award | 1 July 1972–30 June 1974 | 373d Strategic Missile Squadron |
| | Air Force Outstanding Unit Award | 1 July 1984–30 June 1985 | 373d Strategic Missile Squadron |
| | Air Force Outstanding Unit Award | 1 July 1985–30 June 1987 | 373d Strategic Missile Squadron |

| Campaign Streamer | Campaign | Dates | Notes |
|---|---|---|---|
| | Air Offensive, Japan | 20 Mar 1943–2 September 1945 | 373d Bombardment Squadron |
| | Air Combat, Asiatic–Pacific Theater | 20 March 1943-19 December 1945 | 373d Bombardment Squadron |
| | New Guinea | 20 Mar 1943–31 December 1944 | 373d Bombardment Squadron |
| | China Defensive | 20 Mar 1943–4 May 1945 | 373d Bombardment Squadron |
| | India-Burma | 2 April 1943–28 January 1945 | 373d Bombardment Squadron |
| | Western Pacific | 17 April 1945–2 September 1945 | 373d Bombardment Squadron |
| | China Offensive | 5 May 1945–2 September 1945 | 373d Bombardment Squadron |

== See also ==
- List of United States Air Force missile squadrons
- B-24 Liberator units of the United States Army Air Forces
- List of B-29 Superfortress operators
- List of B-47 units of the United States Air Force
