= 425th Bombardment Squadron =

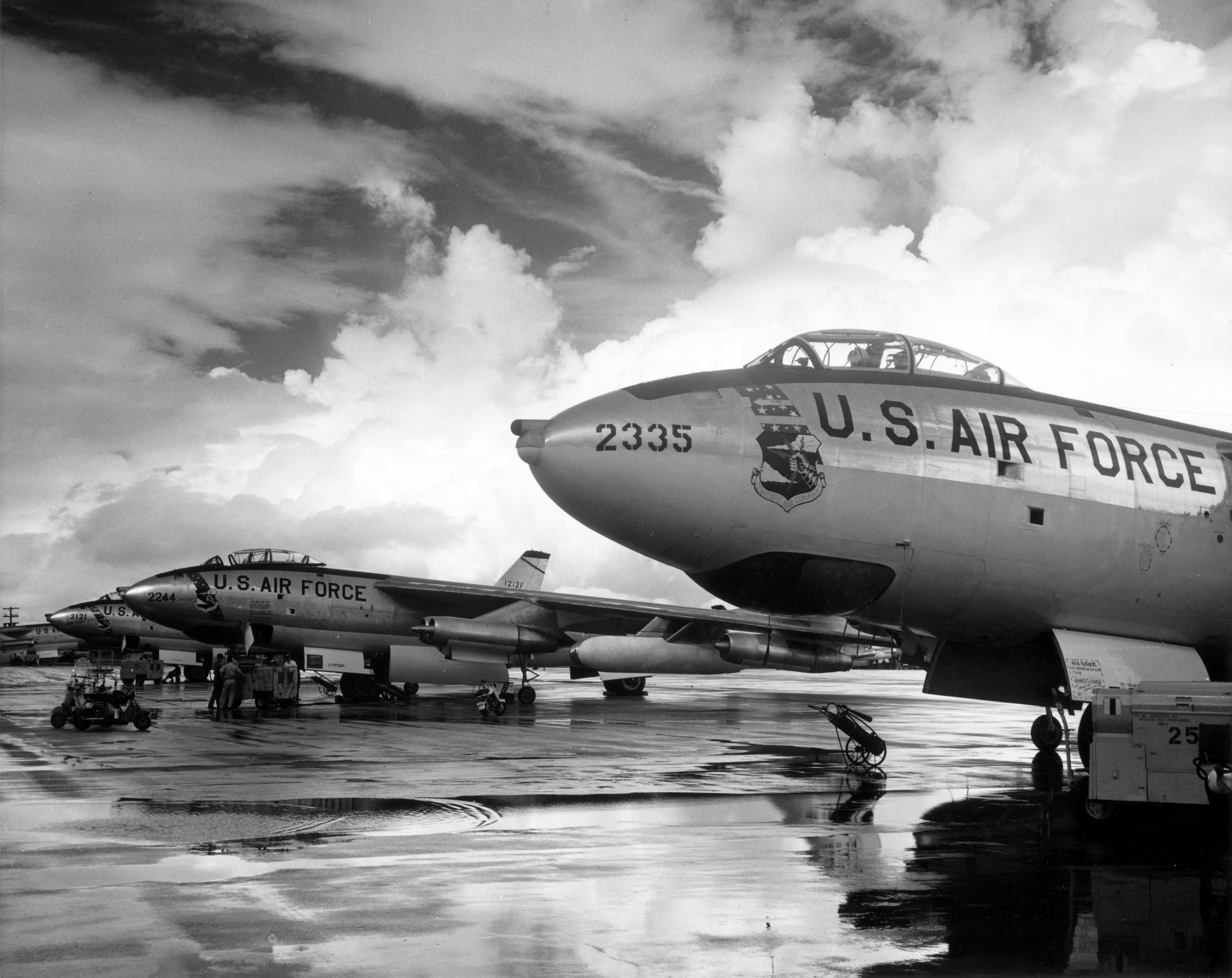
- Strategic Air Command B-47 Stratojets as flown by the squadron
- Active: 1942–1946; 1958–1961
- Country: United States
- Branch: United States Air Force
- Role: Bombardment
- Engagements: China Burma India Theater
- Decorations: Distinguished Unit Citation

Insignia
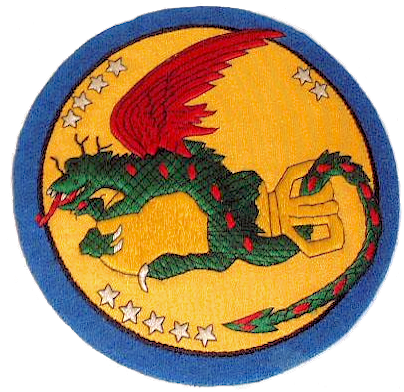
- 425th Bombardment Squadron Emblem (Note: Approved 25 Aug 43. Description: On a tan disc bordure blue, a green dragon, wings, tail barb, tongue, nose, and facial trimmings red, horns black, entwined about a large yellow aerial bomb, eleven white stars arranged four, two and five about outer circumference of tan disc.)

The 425th Bombardment Squadron is an inactive United States Air Force unit. Its last assignment was with 308th Bombardment Wing at Plattsburgh Air Force Base, New York, where it was inactivated in 1961.

The squadron was first activated in 1942 as the 36th Reconnaissance Squadron, but was soon redesignated as the 425th Bombardment Squadron. After training in the United States, it moved to the China Burma India Theater, where it engaged in combat until June 1945, earning a Distinguished Unit Citation. It returned to the United States and was inactivated in early 1946. It was activated again in 1958, when Strategic Air Command expanded its B-47 Stratojet wings to four squadrons, but was inactivated with the 308th Bombardment Wing after a test of a "super wing" concept at Plattsburgh Air Force Base, New York.

== History ==
=== World War II ===
==== Initial organization and training ====
The squadron was activated at Gowen Field, Idaho on 15 April 1942 as the 36th Reconnaissance Squadron, one of the four original squadrons of the 308th Bombardment Group, but a week later was redesignated the 425th Bombardment Squadron. As the squadron was forming and beginning its training in Consolidated B-24 Liberators, at Alamogordo Army Air Field, New Mexico in August 1942, almost all its personnel were transferred to the 330th Bombardment Group.

The following month, a fresh cadre taken from the 39th Bombardment Group joined the group. In addition to its own training activities, at the beginning of October, the unit was briefly designated as an Operational Training Unit The squadron began its movement to the China Burma India Theater in January 1943. The air echelon ferried its Liberators across the Atlantic and Africa, leaving from Morrison Field, while the ground echelon moved by ship across the Pacific.

==== Combat operations ====
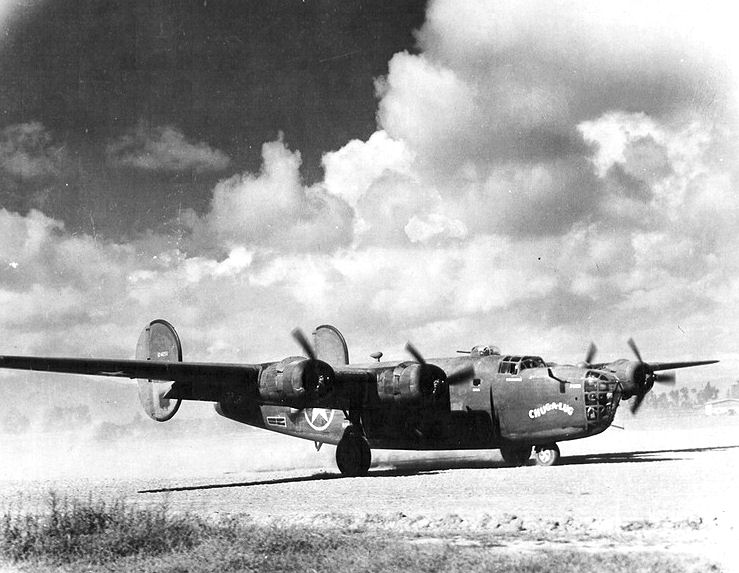
Squadron B-24D Liberator at Kwanghan Airfield, China (Note: Aircraft is Consolidated B-24D-25-CO Liberator, serial 41-24251, Chug-A-Lug.)

In late March 1943, the squadron arrived at Kunming Airport, China. In order to prepare for and sustain combat operations in China, the squadron had to conduct numerous flights over the Hump transporting gasoline, lubricants, ordnance, spare parts and the other items it needed. The 425th supported Chinese ground forces and attacked airfields, coal yards, docks, oil refineries and fuel dumps in French Indochina. It attacked shipping, mined rivers and ports and bombed maintenance shops and docks at Rangoon, Burma and attacked Japanese shipping in the East China Sea, Formosa Straits, South China Sea and Gulf of Tonkin. For its operations interdicting Japanese shipping it was awarded a Distinguished Unit Citation

The squadron moved to Rupsi Airfield, Assam, India in June 1945. Its mission again was primarily air transport as it ferried gasoline and supplies from there back into China. The unit sailed for the United States in October 1945, and it was inactivated at the Port of Embarkation on 6 January 1946.

=== Strategic Air Command ===
The squadron was activated again at in October 1958 at Hunter Air Force Base, Georgia and assigned to the 308th Bombardment Wing as Strategic Air Command (SAC)'s Boeing B-47 Stratojet fleet reached a peak of twenty-seven wings. That year, the B-47 Stratojet wings of SAC assumed an alert posture at their home bases, reducing the amount of time spent on alert at overseas bases. The SAC alert cycle divided itself into four parts: planning, flying, alert and rest to meet General Thomas S. Power's initial goal of maintaining one third of SAC's planes on fifteen minute ground alert, fully fueled and ready for combat to reduce vulnerability to a Soviet missile strike. To implement this new system B-47 wings reorganized from three to four squadrons. The 425th moved to Plattsburgh Air Force Base, New York in July 1959, but never became operational there. Its aircraft were operated by the 380th Bombardment Wing in a test of a "super wing" of 70 B-47s and 40 KC-97s. The test ended in 1960 and the 425th was inactivated on 25 June 1961.

== Lineage ==
- Constituted as the 36th Reconnaissance Squadron (Heavy) on 28 January 1942

Activated on 15 April 1942
Redesignated 425th Bombardment Squadron (Heavy) on 22 April 1942
Redesignated 425th Bombardment Squadron, Heavy in 1944
Inactivated on 6 January 1946
Redesignated 425th Bombardment Squadron, Medium on 11 August 1958
Activated on 1 October 1958
Discontinued, and inactivated on 25 June 1961 (not operational after 15 July 1959)

=== Assignments ===
- 308th Bombardment Group: 15 April 1942 – 6 January 1946
- 308th Bombardment Wing: 1 October 1958 – 25 June 1961

=== Stations ===
- Gowen Field, Idaho, 15 April 1942
- Davis–Monthan Field, Arizona, 18 June 1942
- Alamogordo Army Air Field, New Mexico, 24 July 1942
- Davis–Monthan Field, Arizona, 28 August 1942
- Wendover Field, Utah, 1 October 1942
- Pueblo Army Air Base, Colorado, 1 December 1942 – 2 January 1943
- Kunming Airport, China, 20 March 1943
- Kwanghan Airfield, China, 18 February 1945
- Rupsi Airfield, India, 27 June 1945 – 14 October 1945
- Camp Kilmer, New Jersey, 5 January 1946 – 6 January 1946
- Hunter Air Force Base, Georgia, 1 October 1958
- Plattsburgh Air Force Base, New York, 15 July 1959 – 25 June 1961

=== Aircraft ===
- Douglas B-18 Bolo, 1942
- Consolidated B-24 Liberator, 1942–1945
- Boeing B-47 Stratojet, 1958–1959

=== Awards and campaigns ===
Award streamer	Award	Dates	Notes
	Distinguished Unit Citation	24 May 1944–28 April 1945	East and South China Seas, Straits of Formosa and Gulf of Tonkin

Campaign Streamer	Campaign	Dates	Notes
	China Defensive	20 March 1943–4 May 1945	
	New Guinea	20 March 1943–31 December 1944	
	India-Burma	2 April 1943–28 January 1945	
	Western Pacific	17 April 1945–2 September 1945	
	China Offensive	5 May 1945–2 September 1945	
	Air Combat, Asiatic–Pacific Theater	20 March 1943-14 October 1945	
