= Ultapani Reserve Forest =

Indian nature preserve

Amchang Wildlife Sanctuary
- IUCN category IV (habitat/species management area)
- Location within Assam Location within India
- Interactive map of Amchang Wildlife Sanctuary
- Location: Assam, India
- Nearest city: Guwahati
- Coordinates: 26°11′10″N 92°54′49″E
- Area: 70.13 km^{2} (27.08 sq mi)
- Established: 1972
- Governing body: Department of Environment & Forests, Assam

Ultapani Reserve Forest is a biodiversity area under the Holtugaon Forest Division of the Manas Biosphere Reserve in Kokrajhar district, Assam, India.

The name means "the reverse water", referring to the river that flows through the forest from west to east, unlike most rivers in the region, which flow from east to west. It is located in Kokrajhar Tehsil of Kokrajhar district, Assam, and lies about 55 km from Kokrajhar, the district and sub-district headquarters of Ultapani Forest.

== Fauna ==
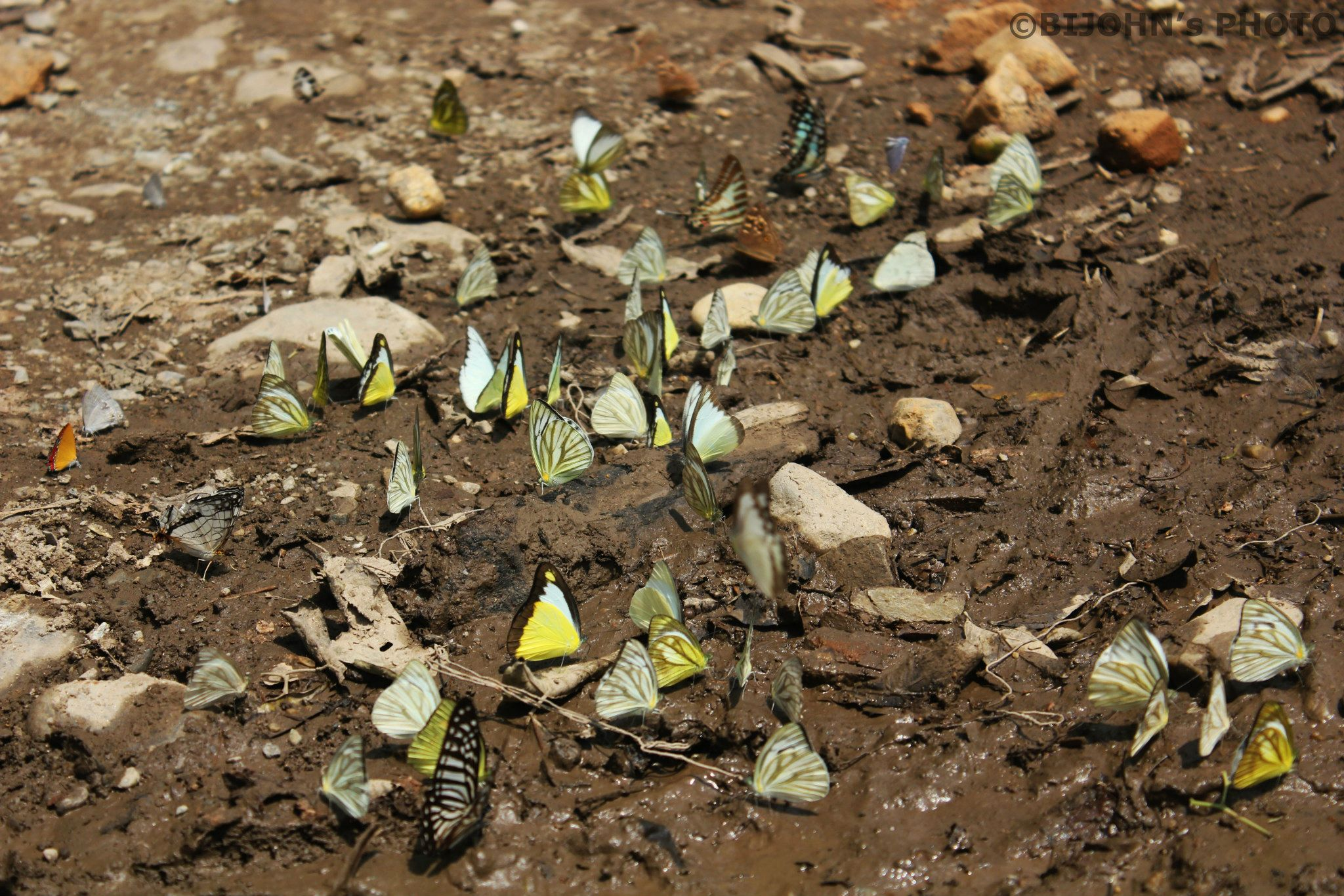
Butterfly in Ultapani

The Ultapani Reserve Forest forms an important part of the Manas Biosphere Reserve. Its forest is primarily composed of semi-evergreen and moist deciduous vegetation. The flora consists largely of evergreen and semi-evergreen species, including medicinal plants, edible fruit-bearing plants, and oil- and timber-yielding species of considerable economic importance.

Ultapani is known as the "Haven of Butterflies" and is the natural habitat of the golden langur, the great pied hornbill, and several other rare, endangered, and threatened (RET) species. Orchids are also an important component of the reserve's biodiversity.

However, the forest is threatened by overexploitation of forest resources, illegal logging, and encroachment for agriculture and human settlement by economically disadvantaged communities. These activities adversely affect wildlife and the ecological balance of the forest.
