= 2078th Air Weather Reconnaissance Squadron =

2078th Weather Reconnaissance Squadron
- Active: 1948-1950
- Country: United States
- Branch: United States Air Force
- Role: Weather Reconnaissance

The 2078th Air Weather Reconnaissance Squadron is a discontinued United States Air Force unit. It was assigned to the 308th Reconnaissance Group, Weather and was discontinued at Tinker Air Force Base, Oklahoma on 20 March 1950.

== History ==
The squadron was established as a weather reconnaissance training unit at Fairfield-Suisun Air Force Base, California, with a mission of training replacement personnel for weather reconnaissance and for conducting special research studies for development of equipment and reconnaissance techniques. It operated Boeing WB-29 Superfortress weather aircraft.

The squadron moved to Tinker Air Force Base, Oklahoma on 1 October 1948. It was discontinued on 30 March 1950. Its personnel and equipment were transferred to the 513th Reconnaissance Squadron. Almost immediately, the 513th was alerted for a special project at Dhahran Airfield, Saudi Arabia. Flight B of the squadron deployed to Arabia, leaving its other flights at Tinker.

== Lineage ==
- Designated as the 1st Weather Reconnaissance Squadron (Special) and organized 1 June 1948

Redesignated 2078th Air Weather Reconnaissance Squadron on 1 October 1948
Discontinued on 20 March 1950

=== Assignments ===
- 308th Reconnaissance Group, 1 June 1948 – 20 March 1950

=== Stations ===
- Fairfield-Suisun Air Force Base, California, 1 June 1948
- Tinker Air Force Base, Oklahoma, 1 October 1949 – 20 March 1950

=== Aircraft ===
- WB-29 Superfortress, 1948-1950
