= Rupsi Airfield =

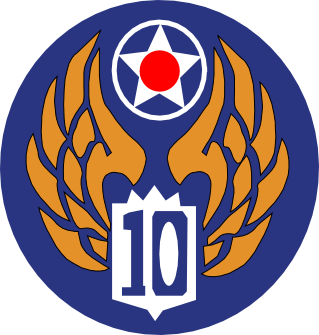
Rupsi Airfield
- Part of Tenth Air Force

Site information
- Type: Military airfield
- Controlled by: United States Army Air Forces

Location
- Coordinates: 26°08′28″N 089°54′25″E (Approximate)

Site history
- Built: 1943
- In use: 1943–1945

Rupsi Airfield is a former wartime United States Army Air Forces airfield in Dhubri, Assam, India used during World War II. It is now abandoned.
