= Mayapuri =

- town
- Location in Delhi, India
- Coordinates: 28.627323°N 77.124109°E
- Country: India
- State: Delhi
- District: West Delhi

Languages
  - Official: Hindi, English
- Time zone: UTC+5:30 (IST)

Mayapuri is an industrial locality in the West Delhi district of Delhi, India. It used to be a major hub of heavy metal and small-scale industries, but following government sanctions, most of the heavy metal industries moved out. The place is now a combination of light metal factories, scrap markets, and automobile service stations. In 2010, a major radiation accident took place in the scrap yards of Mayapuri.

There are some famous landmarks in the area like the Food Corporation of India, Metal Forging and Deen Dayal Upadhyay Hospital. The area is connected with Delhi Metro by Mayapuri station. Mayapuri is also one of the major bus terminals for the Delhi Transport Corporation (DTC).

== 2010 Mayapuri radiation accident ==
In early April 2010, Mayapuri was affected by a serious radiological accident. An AECL Gammacell 220 research irradiator owned by Delhi University since 1968, but unused since 1985, was negligently sold at an auction to a scrap metal dealer in Mayapuri on 26 February 2010. The orphan source arrived at the scrap yard in Mayapuri during March, where it was dismantled by workers unaware of the hazardous nature of the device. The cobalt-60 source was cut into eleven pieces. The smallest of the fragments was taken by Ajay Jain, one of the dealers, who kept it in his wallet; two fragments were moved to a nearby shop; and the remaining eight remained in the scrap yard. Eight people were hospitalized in All India Institute of Medical Sciences, New Delhi for radiation injuries, where one later died due to multi-organ failure. Police cordoned off the market and all ten cobalt sources were recovered by Atomic Energy Regulatory Board in mid-April and transported to Narora Atomic Power Station, where it was claimed that all radioactive material originally contained within the device was accounted for. The material remains in the custody of the Department of Atomic Energy.

The event was rated level 4 out of 7 on the International Nuclear Events Scale. After the incident, AERB organized many awareness drives for Mayapuri scrap dealers broadly on the safety, legal and regulatory aspects while handling and disposal of radioactive materials. A year later, Delhi Police charged six Delhi University chemistry professors for negligent disposal of the radioactive device.

== Metal recycling industry ==
One of the main businesses in Mayapuri is the recycling of metal scraps and sale of salvage vehicle parts. It is, arguably, the biggest market for used automotive and industrial spare parts in India. Many traders from all over India come here to sell or purchase old auto parts. Many small workshops specialised in different metals are active in the Mayapuri area. The safety of the scrap yards became a concern after the radiological accident which occurred in April 2010. The area is not equipped with radiation detectors or portals, despite being standard equipment in scrap yards and recycling facilities in the US and most European countries. The presence of toxic heavy metals and harmful chemicals in the waste generated by these activities threaten the health of several thousands of people living in the area.

== Major landmarks ==
Mayapuri is home to the following key landmarks:

- Metal Forging - one of the oldest forging units
- Food Corporation of India - government organization
- India International Marketing Company
- Swarg Ashram Mandir - temple

== Surrounding areas ==
- Rajouri Garden
- Naraina Vihar
- Hari Nagar
- Tilak Nagar
- Delhi Cantt
- Kirti Nagar

== See also ==
- 1990 Clinic of Zaragoza radiotherapy accident
- Acerinox accident
- Goiânia accident
- Ionizing radiation
- List of civilian radiation accidents
- Nuclear safety
- Nuclear whistleblowers
- Orphan source
- Radiation accident in Mexico City
- Radioactive scrap metal
- Radiotherapy accident in Costa Rica
- X-ray
