= Nuclear and radiation accidents and incidents =

Severe events involving radioactive materials

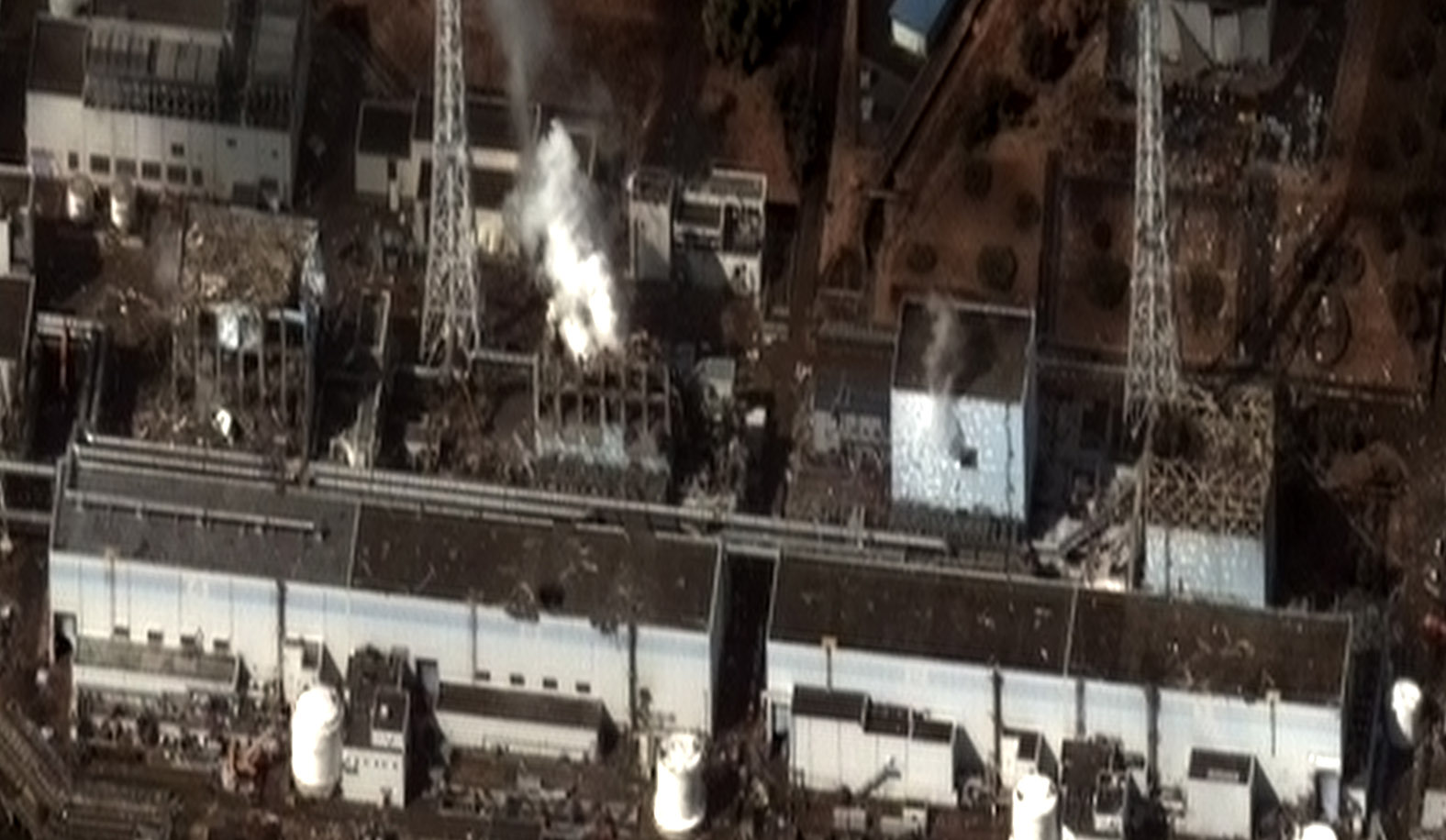
Following the 2011 Japanese Fukushima nuclear accident, authorities shut down the nation's 54 nuclear power plants. The Fukushima site remains radioactive, with about 30,000 evacuees still living in temporary housing as of late 2011, although nobody has died or is expected to die from radiation effects. The difficult cleanup job will take 40 or more years, and cost the equivelent of tens of billions of US dollars.

Pathways from airborne radioactive contamination to human

A nuclear and radiation accident is defined by the International Atomic Energy Agency (IAEA) as "an event that has led to significant consequences to people, the environment or the facility." Examples include lethal effects to individuals, large radioactivity release to the environment, or a reactor core melt. The prime example of a "major nuclear accident" is one in which a reactor core is damaged and significant amounts of radioactive isotopes are released, such as in the Chernobyl disaster in 1986 and the Fukushima nuclear accident in 2011.

The impact of nuclear accidents has been a topic of debate since the first nuclear reactors were constructed in 1954 and has been a key factor in public concern about nuclear facilities. Technical measures to reduce the risk of accidents or to minimize the amount of radioactivity released to the environment have been adopted; however, human error remains, and there have been many accidents with varying impacts as well as near misses and incidents. As of 2014, there have been more than 100 serious nuclear accidents and incidents from the use of nuclear power. Fifty-seven accidents or severe incidents have occurred since the Chernobyl disaster, and about 60% of all nuclear-related accidents/severe incidents have occurred in the United States. Serious nuclear power plant accidents include the Fukushima nuclear accident (2011), the Chernobyl disaster (1986), the Three Mile Island accident (1979), and the SL-1 accident (1961). Nuclear power accidents can involve loss of life and large monetary costs for remediation work.

Nuclear submarine accidents include the K-19 (1961), K-11 (1965), K-27 (1968), K-140 (1968), K-429 (1970), K-222 (1980), and K-431 (1985) accidents. Serious radiation incidents and accidents include the Kyshtym disaster, the Windscale fire, the radiotherapy accident in Costa Rica, the radiotherapy accident in Zaragoza, the radiation accident in Morocco, the Goiania accident, the radiation accident in Mexico City, the Samut Prakan radiation accident, and the Mayapuri radiological accident in India.

The IAEA maintains a website reporting recent nuclear accidents.

In 2020, the WHO stated that "Lessons learned from past radiological and nuclear accidents have demonstrated that the mental health and psychosocial consequences can outweigh the direct physical health impacts of radiation exposure.""

== Nuclear plant accidents ==
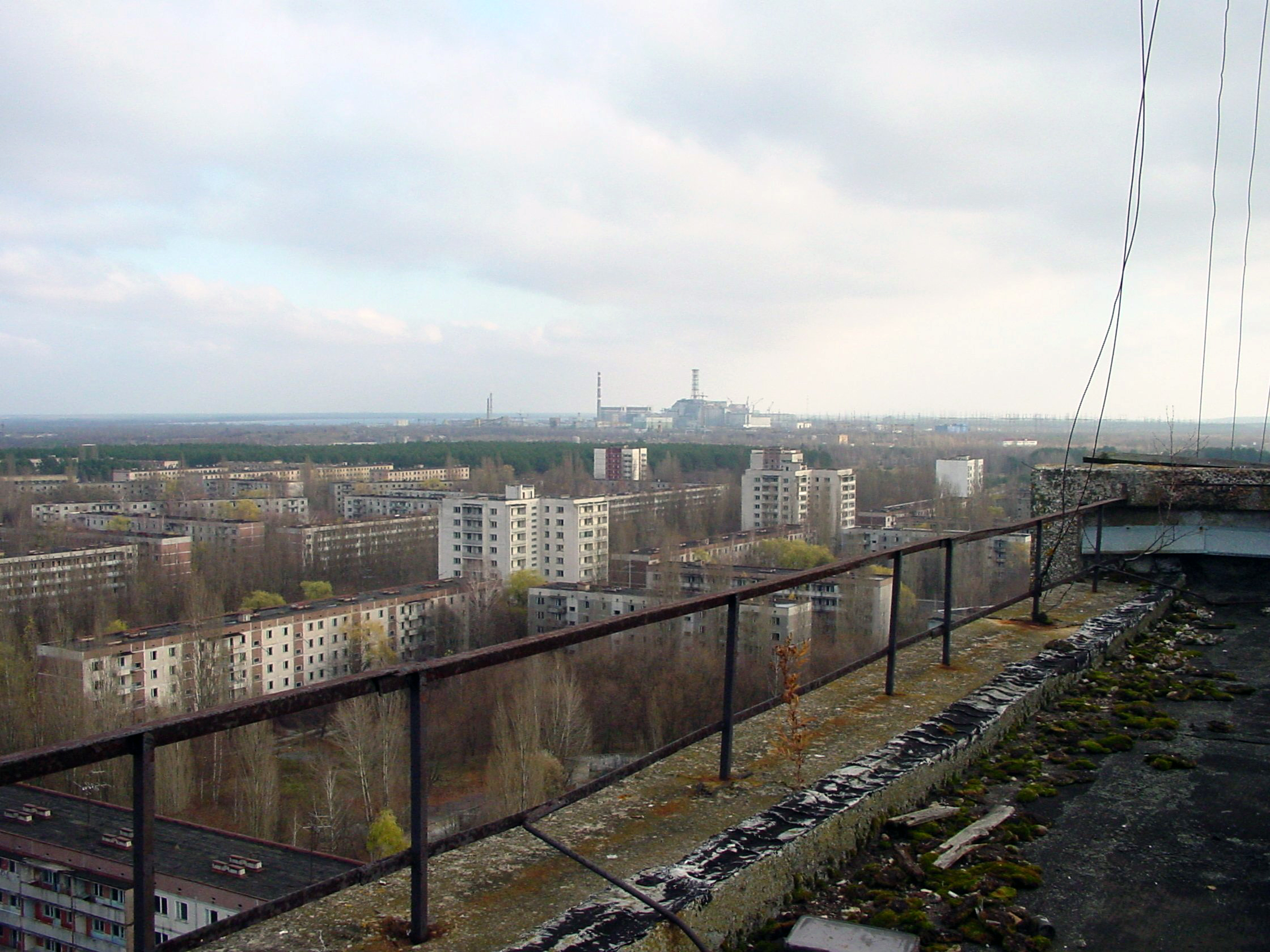
The abandoned city of Pripyat, Ukraine, following the Chernobyl disaster. The Chernobyl nuclear power plant is in the background.

The world's first nuclear reactor meltdown was the NRX reactor at Chalk River Laboratories, Ontario, Canada in 1952.

The worst nuclear accident is the Chernobyl disaster which occurred in 1986 in the Ukrainian SSR, now Ukraine. The accident killed approximately 30 people directly and damaged approximately $7 billion of property. A study published in 2005 by the World Health Organization estimates that there may eventually be up to 4,000 additional cancer deaths related to the accident among those exposed to significant radiation levels. Radioactive fallout from the accident was concentrated in areas of Belarus, Ukraine and Russia. Other studies have estimated as many as over a million eventual cancer deaths from Chernobyl. Estimates of eventual deaths from cancer are highly contested. Industry, UN and DOE agencies claim low numbers of legally provable cancer deaths will be traceable to the disaster. The UN, DOE and industry agencies all use the limits of the epidemiological resolvable deaths as the cutoff below which they cannot be legally proven to come from the disaster. Independent studies statistically calculate fatal cancers from dose and population, even though the number of additional cancers will be below the epidemiological threshold of measurement of around 1%. These are two very different concepts and lead to the huge variations in estimates. Both are reasonable projections with different meanings. Approximately 350,000 people were forcibly resettled away from these areas soon after the accident. 6,000 people were involved in cleaning Chernobyl and 10,800 square miles (28,000 km^{2}) were contaminated.

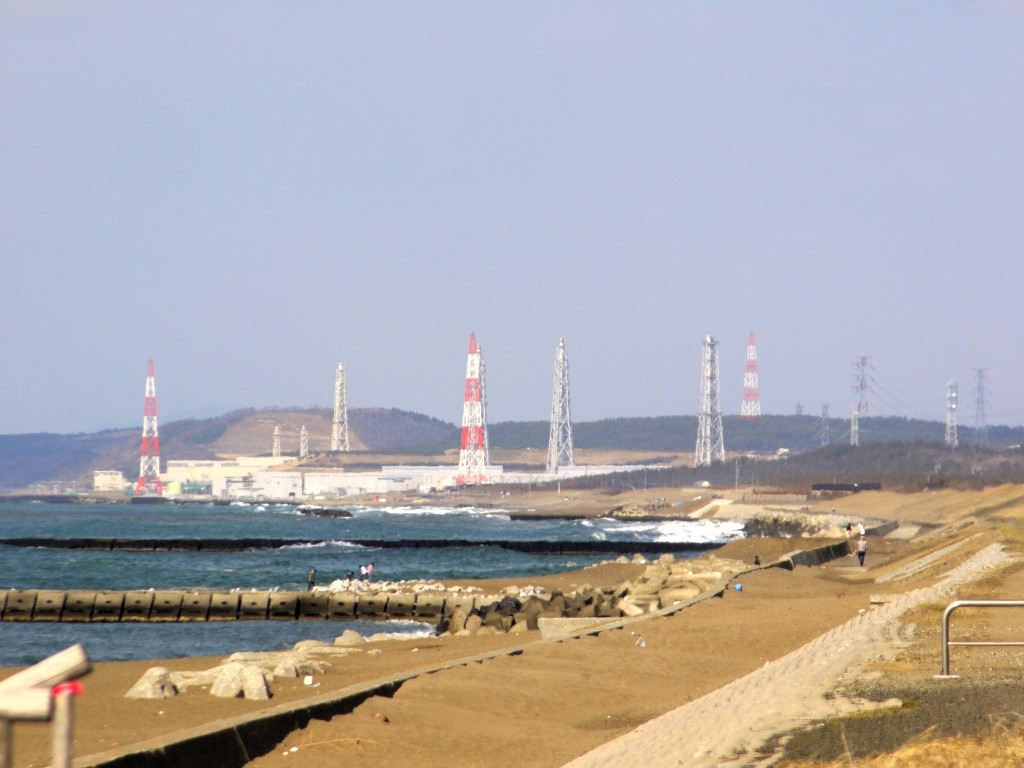
The Kashiwazaki-Kariwa Nuclear Power Plant, a Japanese nuclear plant with seven units, the largest single nuclear power station in the world, was shut down for 21 months following an earthquake in 2007. Safety-critical systems were found to be undamaged by the earthquake.

Social scientist and energy policy expert Benjamin K. Sovacool has reported that worldwide there have been 99 accidents at nuclear power plants from 1952 to 2009 (defined as incidents that either resulted in the loss of human life or more than US$50,000 of property damage, the amount the US federal government uses to define major energy accidents that must be reported), totaling US$20.5 billion in property damages. There have been comparatively few fatalities associated with nuclear power plant accidents. An academic review of many reactor accident and the phenomena of these events was published by Mark Foreman.

=== List of major nuclear plant accidents and incidents ===
Nuclear plant accidents and incidents with multiple fatalities and/or more than US$100 million in property damage, 1952–2011
Date	Location of accident	Description of accident or incident	Numbers of deaths	Cost ($US millions 2006)	INES level
September 29, 1957	Mayak, Kyshtym, Soviet Union	The Kyshtym disaster was a radiation contamination accident (after a chemical explosion that occurred within a storage tank) at Mayak, a nuclear fuel reprocessing plant in the Soviet Union.	Estimated 200 possible cancer fatalities		6
October 10, 1957	Sellafield, Cumberland, United Kingdom	Windscale fire at the British atomic bomb project (in a plutonium-production reactor) damaged the core and released an estimated 740 terabecquerels of iodine-131 into the environment. A rudimentary smoke filter constructed over the main outlet chimney successfully prevented a far worse radiation leak.	0 direct, estimated up to 240 possible cancer cases, though epidemiological studies have found no increase in cancer levels linked to the accident.		5
October 15, 1958	Vinča, Yugoslavia	The Vinča nuclear accident happened at the Boris Kidrič Institute of Nuclear Sciences in Vinča, Yugoslavia. During a subcritical experiment on the new heavy water moderated reactor, an undetected power build up due to human error caused a criticality which irradiated 6 scientists.	Caused one death.		4
January 3, 1961	Idaho Falls, Idaho, United States	Explosion at U.S. Army SL-1 prototype at the National Reactor Testing Station. All 3 operators were killed when a control rod was manually lifted too high. The reactor went from complete shutdown to 20 GW in a few milliseconds. It also jumped over 9 feet (2.7 m) in the air.	3	22	4
October 5, 1966	Frenchtown Charter Township, Michigan, United States	Meltdown of some fuel elements in the Fermi 1 Reactor at the Enrico Fermi Nuclear Generating Station. Little radiation leakage into the environment.	0	132	4
January 21, 1969	Lucens reactor, Vaud, Switzerland	On January 21, 1969, it suffered a loss-of-coolant accident, leading to meltdown of one fuel element and radioactive contamination of the cavern, which was then sealed.	0		4
December 7, 1975	Greifswald, East Germany	Electrical error in Greifswald Nuclear Power Plant caused a fire in the main trough that destroyed control lines and five main coolant pumps.	0	443	3
January 5, 1976	Jaslovské Bohunice, Czechoslovakia	Malfunction during fuel replacement. Fuel rod ejected from reactor into the reactor hall by coolant (CO_{2}).	2	1,700	4
March 28, 1979	Three Mile Island, Pennsylvania, United States	Loss of coolant and partial core meltdown due to operator errors and technical flaws. There was a small release of radioactive gases. See also Three Mile Island accident health effects.	0	2,400	5
March 13, 1980	Saint-Laurent-Nouan, Loir-et-Cher, France	Partial Core damage after a Power excursion at Saint-Laurent Nuclear Power Plant A2	0		4
September 15, 1984	Athens, Alabama, United States	Safety violations, operator error and design problems forced a six-year outage at Browns Ferry Unit 2.	0	110	
March 9, 1985	Athens, Alabama, United States	Instrumentation systems malfunction during startup, which led to suspension of operations at all three Browns Ferry Units.	0	1,830	
April 11, 1986	Plymouth, Massachusetts, United States	Recurring equipment problems forced emergency shutdown of Boston Edison's Pilgrim Nuclear Power Plant.	0	1,001	
April 26, 1986	Chernobyl, Chernobyl Raion (now Vyshhorod Raion), Kiev Oblast, Ukrainian SSR, Soviet Union	A flawed reactor design and inadequate safety procedures led to a power surge that damaged the fuel rods of reactor no. 4 of the Chernobyl power plant. This caused an explosion and meltdown, necessitating the evacuation of 300,000 people and dispersing radioactive material across Europe (see Effects of the Chernobyl disaster). Around 5% (5200 PBq) of the core was released into the atmosphere and downwind.	28 direct, 19 not entirely related and 15 children due to thyroid cancer, as of 2008. Estimated up to 4,000 possible cancer deaths.	6,700	7
May 4, 1986	Hamm-Uentrop, West Germany	Experimental THTR-300 reactor released small amounts of fission products (0.1 GBq Co-60, Cs-137, Pa-233) to surrounding area.	0	267	
December 9, 1986	Surry, Virginia, United States	Feedwater pipe break at Surry Nuclear Power Plant killed 4 workers.	4		
March 31, 1987	Delta, Pennsylvania, United States	Peach Bottom units 2 and 3 shutdown due to cooling malfunctions and unexplained equipment problems.	0	400	
September 31, 1987	Goiania, Goiás, Brazil	Violation of a radiotherapy core machine. Garbage collectors opened an abandoned radiotherapy machine, exposing the population to cesium-137 powder and spreading contamination across Goiânia.	4	20	5
December 19, 1987	Lycoming, New York, United States	Malfunctions forced Niagara Mohawk Power Corporation to shut down Nine Mile Point Unit 1.	0	150	
March 17, 1989	Lusby, Maryland, United States	Inspections at Calvert Cliff Units 1 and 2 revealed cracks at pressurized heater sleeves, forcing extended shutdowns.	0	120	
October 19, 1989	Vandellòs, Spain	A fire damaged the cooling system in unit 1 of the Vandellòs Nuclear Power Plant, getting the core close to meltdown. The cooling system was restored before the meltdown but the unit had to be shut down due to the elevated cost of the repair.	0	220	3
March 1992	Sosnovy Bor, Leningrad Oblast, Russia	An accident at the Sosnovy Bor nuclear plant leaked radioactive iodine into the air through a ruptured fuel channel.			
February 20, 1996	Waterford, Connecticut, United States	Leaking valve forced shutdown of Millstone Nuclear Power Plant Units 1 and 2, multiple equipment failures found.	0	254	
September 2, 1996	Crystal River, Florida, United States	Balance-of-plant equipment malfunction forced shutdown and extensive repairs at Crystal River Unit 3.	0	384	
December 27, 1999	Gironde, France	Flooding of the power plant caused multiple safety system failures at the Blayais Nuclear Power Plant	0		2
September 30, 1999	Ibaraki Prefecture, Japan	Tokaimura nuclear accident killed two workers, and exposed one more to radiation levels above permissible limits.	2	54	4
February 16, 2002	Oak Harbor, Ohio, United States	Severe corrosion of reactor vessel head forced 24-month outage of Davis-Besse reactor.	0	143	3
April 10, 2003	Paks, Hungary	Collapse of fuel rods at Paks Nuclear Power Plant unit 2 during its corrosion cleaning led to leakage of radioactive gases. It remained inactive for 18 months.	0		3
August 9, 2004	Fukui Prefecture, Japan	Steam explosion at Mihama Nuclear Power Plant killed 4 workers and injured 7 more.	4	9	1
July 25, 2006	Forsmark, Sweden	An electrical fault at Forsmark Nuclear Power Plant caused multiple failures in safety systems critical for reactor cooling.	0	100	2
March 11, 2011	Fukushima, Japan	The Fukushima nuclear disaster was triggered by a tsunami that flooded and damaged the 3 active reactors at the Fukushima Daiichi nuclear power plant, drowning two workers. Loss of backup electrical power led to overheating, meltdowns, and evacuations. One man died suddenly while carrying equipment during the clean-up. The plant's reactors Nos. 4, 5 and 6 were inactive at the time.	1 and 3+ labour accidents; plus a broader number of primarily ill or elderly people from evacuation stress	1,255–2,078 (2018 est.)	7
September 12, 2011	Marcoule, France	One person was killed and four injured, one seriously, in a blast at the Marcoule Nuclear Site. The explosion took place in a furnace used to melt metallic waste.	1		

== Nuclear reactor attacks ==
The vulnerability of nuclear plants to deliberate attack is of concern in the area of nuclear safety and security. Nuclear power plants, civilian research reactors, certain naval fuel facilities, uranium enrichment plants, fuel fabrication plants, and potentially even uranium mines are vulnerable to attacks which could lead to widespread radioactive contamination. The attack threat is of several general types: commando-like ground-based attacks on equipment which if disabled could lead to a reactor core meltdown or widespread dispersal of radioactivity, external attacks such as an aircraft crash into a reactor complex, or cyber attacks.

The United States 9/11 Commission found that nuclear power plants were potential targets originally considered as part of the September 11 attacks. If terrorist groups could sufficiently damage safety systems to cause a core meltdown at a nuclear power plant, or sufficiently damage spent fuel pools, such an attack could lead to widespread radioactive contamination. The Federation of American Scientists have said that if nuclear power use is to expand significantly, nuclear facilities will have to be made extremely safe from attacks that could release radioactivity into the environment. New reactor designs have features of passive nuclear safety, which may help. In the United States, the NRC carries out "Force on Force" (FOF) exercises at all Nuclear Power Plant (NPP) sites at least once every three years.

Nuclear reactors become preferred targets during military conflict and have been repeatedly attacked during military air strikes, occupations, invasions and campaigns over the period 1980–2007. Various acts of civil disobedience since 1980 by the peace group Plowshares have shown how nuclear weapons facilities can be penetrated, and the group's actions represent extraordinary breaches of security at nuclear weapons plants in the United States. The National Nuclear Security Administration has acknowledged the seriousness of the 2012 Plowshares action. Non-proliferation policy experts have questioned "the use of private contractors to provide security at facilities that manufacture and store the government's most dangerous military material". Nuclear weapons materials on the black market are a global concern, and there is concern about the possible detonation of a small, crude nuclear weapon or dirty bomb by a militant group in a major city, causing significant loss of life and property.

The number and sophistication of cyber attacks is on the rise. Stuxnet is a computer worm discovered in June 2010 that is believed to have been created by the United States and Israel to attack Iran's nuclear facilities. It switched off safety devices, causing centrifuges to spin out of control. The computers of South Korea's nuclear plant operator (KHNP) were hacked in December 2014. The cyber attacks involved thousands of phishing emails containing malicious codes, and information was stolen.

In March 2022, the Battle of Enerhodar caused damage to the Zaporizhzhia Nuclear Power Plant and a fire at its training complex as Russian forces took control, heightening concerns of nuclear contamination. On September 6, 2022, IAEA Director General Rafael Grossi addressed the UN Security Council, calling for a nuclear safety and security protection zone around the plant and reiterating his findings that "the Seven Pillars [for nuclear safety and security] have all been compromised at the site."

== Radiation and other accidents and incidents ==
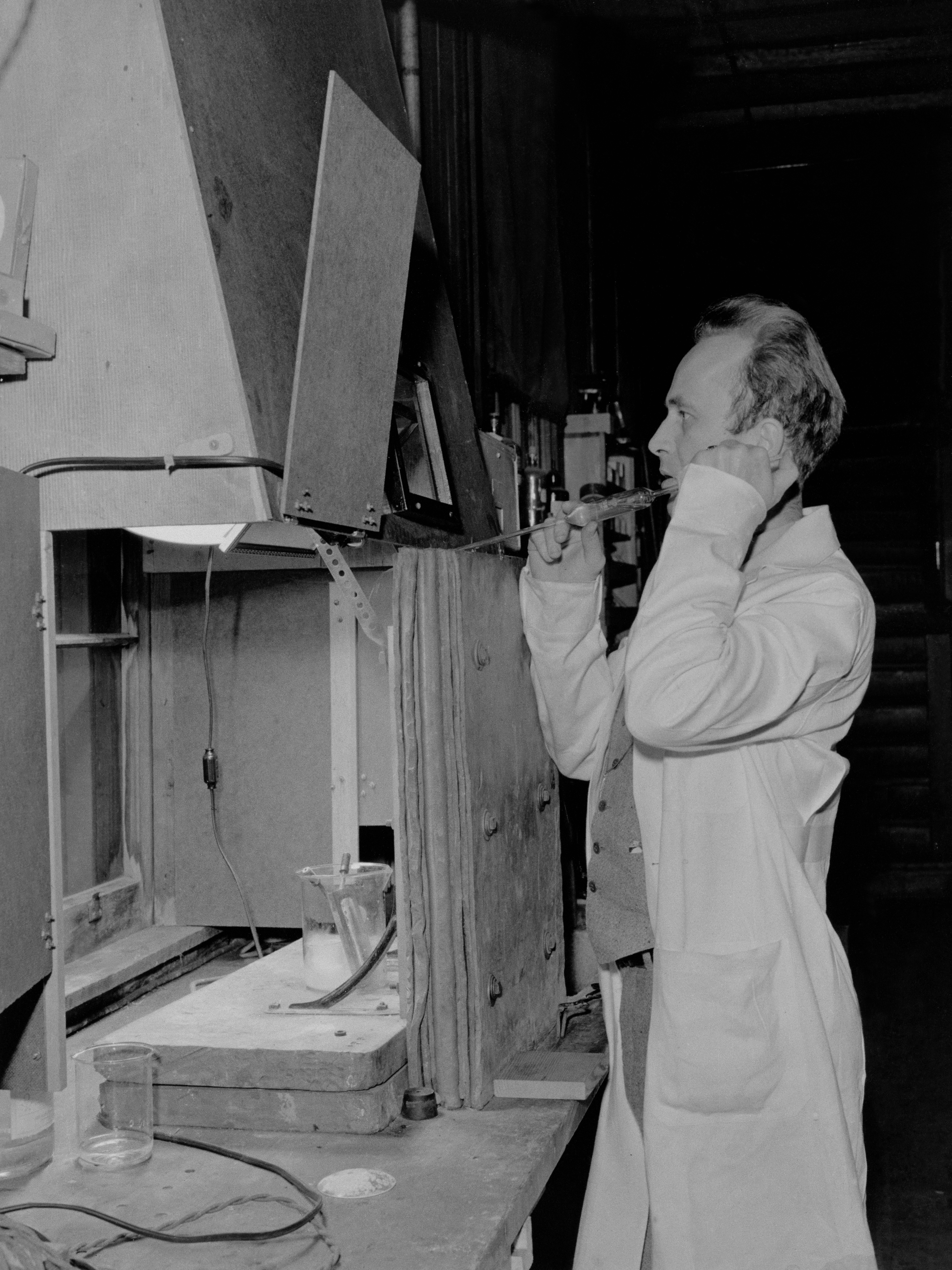
Dr. Joseph G. Hamilton was the primary researcher for the human plutonium experiments done at U.C. San Francisco from 1944 to 1947. Hamilton wrote a memo in 1950 discouraging further human experiments because the AEC would be left open "to considerable criticism" since the experiments as proposed had "a little of the Buchenwald touch."

One of four example estimates of the plutonium (Pu-239) plume from the 1957 fire at the Rocky Flats Nuclear Weapons Plant near Denver, Colorado. Public protests and a combined Federal Bureau of Investigation and United States Environmental Protection Agency raid in 1989 stopped production at the plant.

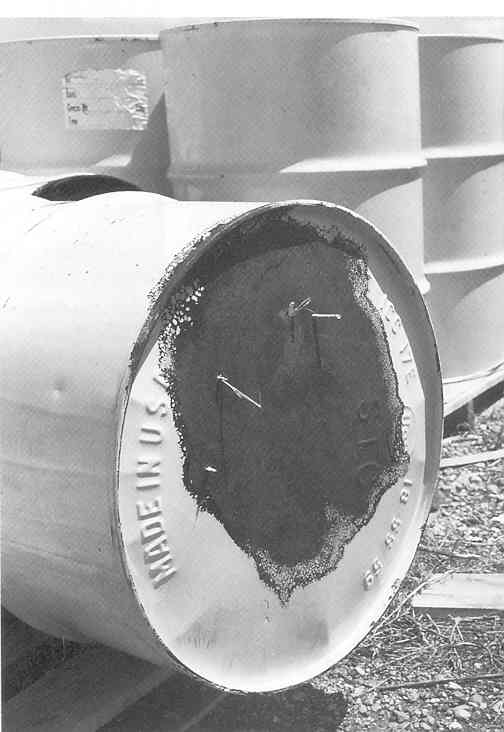
Corroded and leaking 55-gallon drum, for storing radioactive waste at the Rocky Flats Plant, tipped on its side so the bottom is showing.

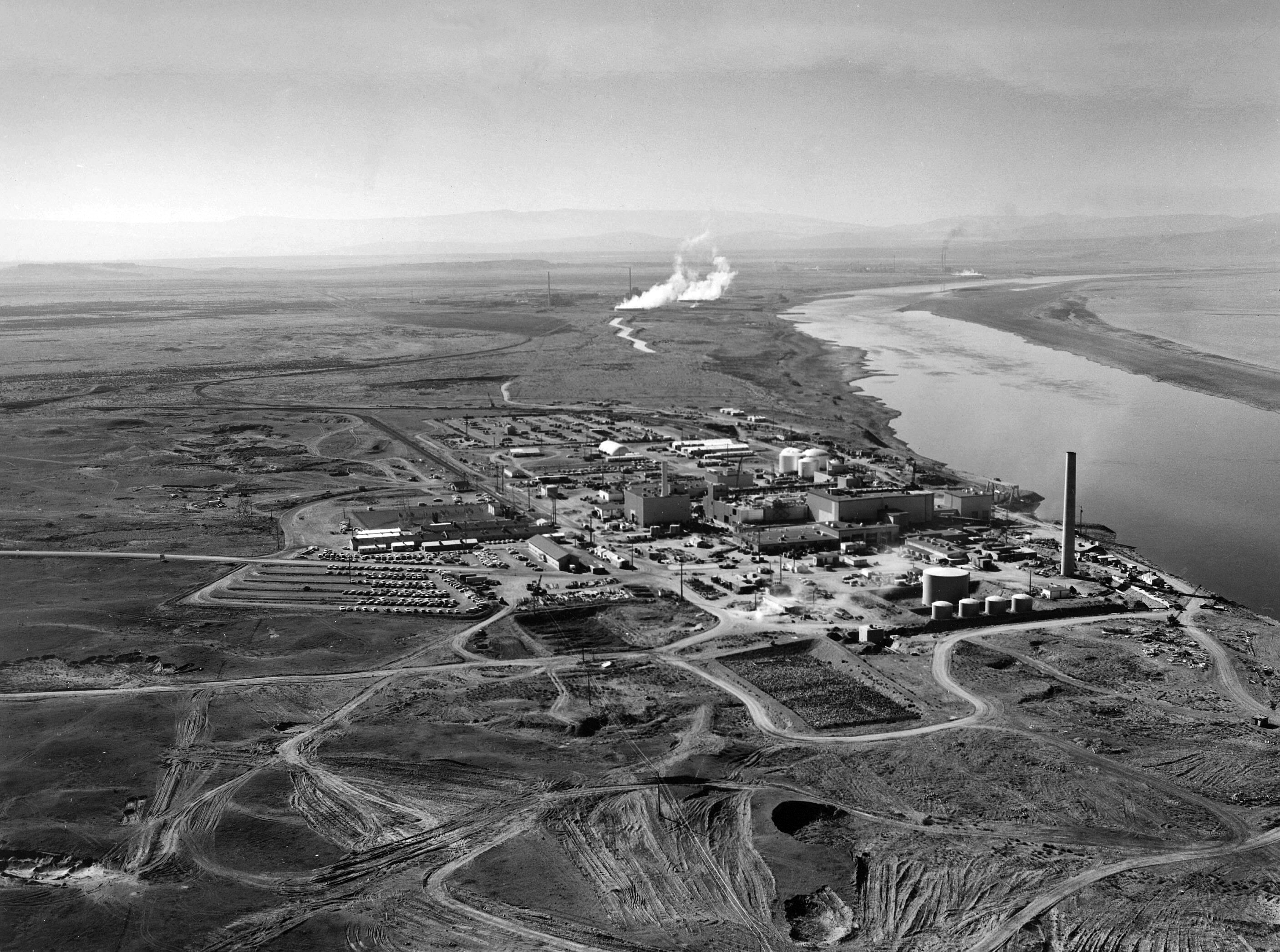
The Hanford site represents two-thirds of USA's high-level radioactive waste by volume. Nuclear reactors line the riverbank at the Hanford Site along the Columbia River in January 1960.

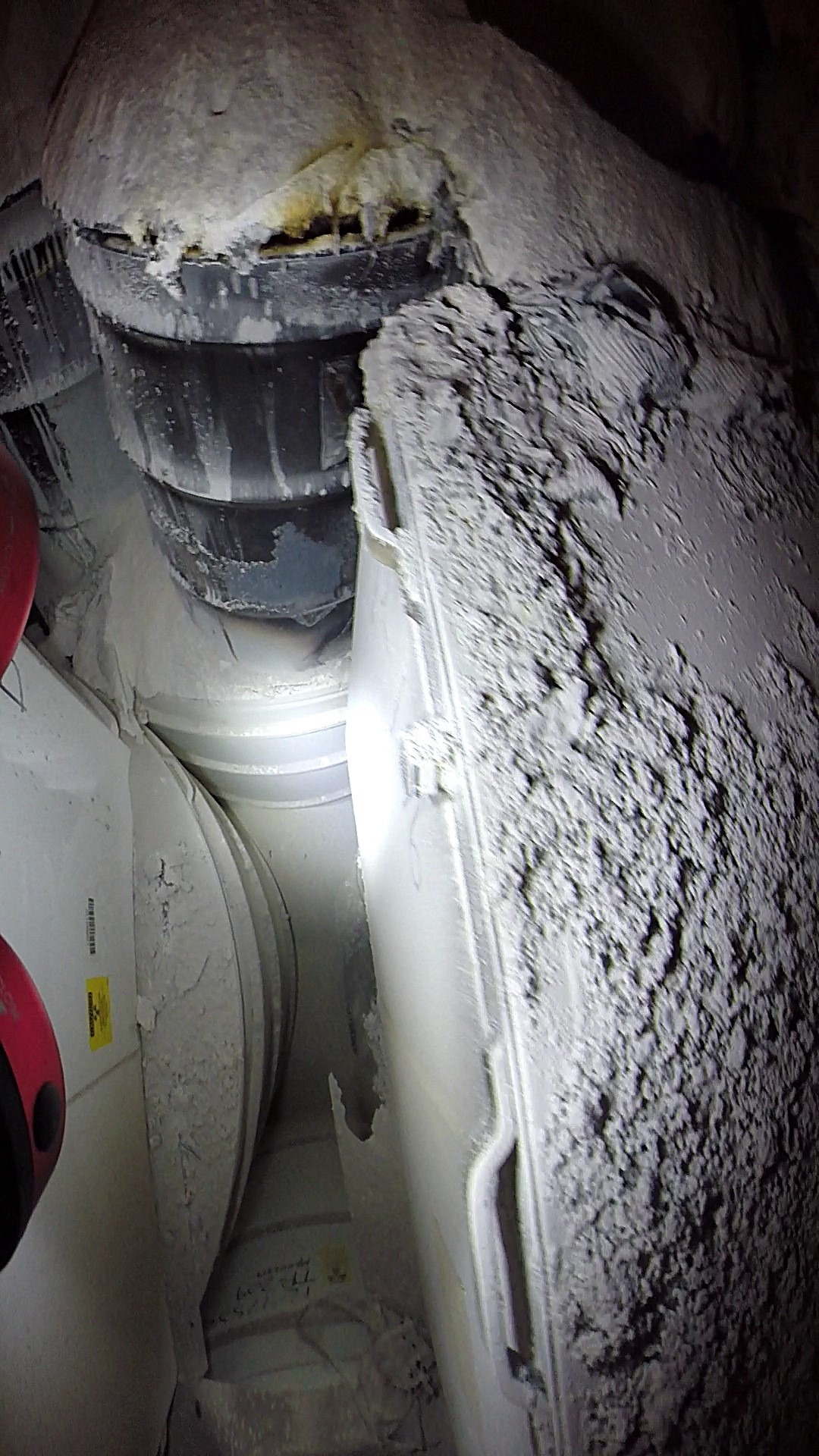
On Feb. 14, 2014, at the WIPP, radioactive materials leaked from a damaged storage drum (see photo). Analysis of several accidents, by DOE, have shown lack of a "safety culture" at the facility.

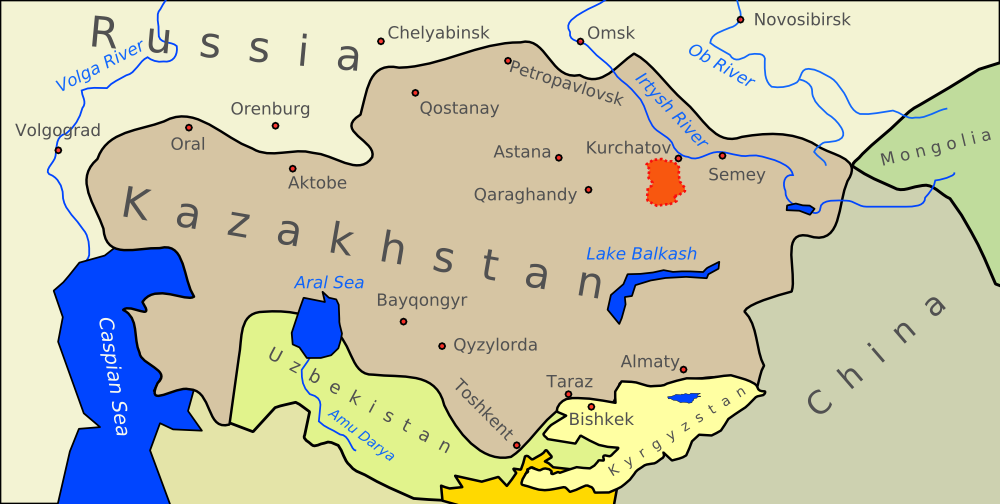
The 18,000 km^{2} expanse of the Semipalatinsk Test Site (indicated in red), which covers an area the size of Wales. The Soviet Union conducted 456 nuclear tests at Semipalatinsk from 1949 until 1989 with little regard for their effect on the local people or environment. The full impact of radiation exposure was hidden for many years by Soviet authorities and has only come to light since the test site closed in 1991.

2007 ISO radioactivity danger symbol. The red background is intended to convey urgent danger, and the sign is intended to be used in places or on equipment where exceptionally intense radiation fields could be encountered or created through misuse or tampering. The intention is that a normal user will never see such a sign, however after partly dismantling the equipment the sign will be exposed warning that the person should stop work and leave the scene.

Serious radiation and other accidents and incidents include:

1940s

- May 1945: American Albert Stevens was one of several subjects of a human radiation experiment, and was injected with plutonium without his knowledge or informed consent. Although Stevens was the person who received the highest dose of radiation during the plutonium experiments, he was neither the first nor the last subject to be studied. Eighteen people aged 4 to 69 in the United States were injected with plutonium. Subjects who were chosen for the experiment had been diagnosed with a terminal disease. They lived from 6 days up to 44 years past the time of their injection. Eight of the 18 died within two years of the injection. Although one cause of death was unknown, a report by William Moss and Roger Eckhardt concluded that there was "no evidence that any of the patients died for reasons that could be attributed to the plutonium injections. Patients from Rochester, Chicago, and Oak Ridge were also injected with plutonium in the Manhattan Project human experiments.
- 6–9 August 1945: On the orders of President Harry S. Truman, a uranium-gun design bomb, Little Boy, was used against the city of Hiroshima, Japan. Fat Man, a plutonium implosion-design bomb was used against the city of Nagasaki. The two weapons killed approximately 120,000 to 140,000 civilians and military personnel instantly and thousands more have died over the years from radiation sickness and related cancers.
- August 1945: Criticality accident at US Los Alamos National Laboratory. Harry Daghlian dies.
- May 1946: Criticality accident at Los Alamos National Laboratory. Louis Slotin dies.

1950s

- 13 February 1950: a Convair B-36B crashed in northern British Columbia after jettisoning a Mark IV atomic bomb. This was the first such nuclear weapon loss in history.
- 12 December 1952: NRX AECL Chalk River Laboratories, Chalk River, Ontario, Canada. Partial meltdown, about 10,000 Curies released. Approximately 1202 people were involved in the two-year cleanup. Future president Jimmy Carter was one of the many people that helped clean up the accident.
- 15 March 1953: Mayak, former Soviet Union. Criticality accident. Contamination of plant personnel occurred.
- 1 March 1954: The 15 Mt Castle Bravo shot of 1954 which spread considerable nuclear fallout on many Pacific islands, including several which were inhabited, and some that had not been evacuated.
  - 1 March 1954: Daigo Fukuryū Maru, Japanese fishing vessel contaminated by fallout from Castle Bravo, 1 fatality.
  - 2 March 1954: US Navy tanker USS Patapsco contaminated by fallout from Castle Bravo while sailing from Enewetak Atoll to Pearl Harbor.
- September 1957: a plutonium fire occurred at the Rocky Flats Plant, which resulted in the contamination of Building 71 and the release of plutonium into the atmosphere, causing US$818,600 in damage.
- 21 May 1957: Mayak, former Soviet Union. Criticality accident in the factory number 20 in the collection oxalate decantate after filtering sediment oxalate enriched uranium. Six people received doses of 300 to 1,000 rem (four women and two men), one woman died.
- 29 September 1957: Kyshtym disaster: Nuclear waste storage tank explosion at the same Mayak plant, Russia. No immediate fatalities, though up to 200+ additional cancer deaths might have ensued from the radioactive contamination of the surrounding area; 270,000 people were exposed to dangerous radiation levels. Over thirty small communities were removed from Soviet maps between 1958 and 1991. (INES level 6)
- October 1957: Windscale fire, UK. Fire ignites a "plutonium pile" (an air cooled, graphite moderated, uranium fuelled reactor that was used for plutonium and isotope production) and contaminates surrounding dairy farms. An estimated 33 cancer deaths.
- 1957-1964: Rocketdyne located at the Santa Susanna Field Lab, 30 miles north of Los Angeles, California operated ten experimental nuclear reactors. Numerous accidents occurred including a core meltdown. Experimental reactors of that era were not required to have the same type of containment structures that shield modern nuclear reactors. During the Cold War time in which the accidents that occurred at Rocketdyne, these events were not publicly reported by the Department of Energy.
- 1958: Fuel rupture and fire at the National Research Universal reactor (NRU), Chalk River, Canada.
- 10 February 1958: Mayak, former Soviet Union. Criticality accident in SCR plant. Conducted experiments to determine the critical mass of enriched uranium in a cylindrical container with different concentrations of uranium in solution. Staff broke the rules and instructions for working with YADM (nuclear fissile material). When SCR personnel received doses from 7,600 to 13,000 rem. Three people died, one man got radiation sickness and went blind.
- 15 October 1958: Vinča, Yugoslavia. There was a criticality incident in a newly installed reactor. Six young researchers received high doses of radiation, and were subsequently treated at "Kiri" institute in Paris where one of them died.
- 30 December 1958: Cecil Kelley criticality accident at Los Alamos National Laboratory.
- March 1959: Santa Susana Field Laboratory, Los Angeles, California. Fire in a fuel processing facility.
- July 1959: Santa Susana Field Laboratory, Los Angeles, California. Partial meltdown.
- October 15, 1959, a B-52 carrying two nuclear weapons collided in midair with a KC-135 tanker near Hardinsburg, Kentucky. One of the nuclear bombs was damaged by fire but both weapons were recovered.

1960s

- 7 June 1960: the 1960 Fort Dix IM-99 accident destroyed a CIM-10 Bomarc nuclear missile and shelter and contaminated the BOMARC Missile Accident Site in New Jersey, United States.
- 24 January 1961: the 1961 Goldsboro B-52 crash occurred near Goldsboro, North Carolina, United States. A B-52 Stratofortress carrying two Mark 39 nuclear bombs broke up in mid-air, dropping its nuclear payload in the process.
- July 1961: Soviet submarine K-19 accident. Eight fatalities and more than 30 people were over-exposed to radiation.
- July 6, 1962 Sedan nuclear test accidentally released 33 PBq of radioactive iodine-131 and other radioactive material.
- 21 March–August 1962: radiation accident in Mexico City, four fatalities.
- 23 July 1964: Wood River Junction criticality accident. Resulted in 1 fatality
- 1964, 1969: Santa Susana Field Laboratory, Los Angeles, California. Partial meltdowns.
- 1965 Philippine Sea A-4 crash, where a Skyhawk attack aircraft with a nuclear weapon fell into the sea. The pilot, the aircraft, and the B43 nuclear bomb were never recovered. It was not until the 1980s that the Pentagon revealed the loss of the one-megaton bomb.
- October 1965: US CIA-led expedition abandons a nuclear-powered telemetry relay listening device on Nanda Devi
- 17 January 1966: the 1966 Palomares B-52 crash occurred when a B-52G bomber of the USAF collided with a KC-135 tanker during mid-air refuelling off the coast of Spain. The KC-135 was completely destroyed when its fuel load ignited, killing all four crew members. The B-52G broke apart, killing three of the seven crew members aboard. Of the four Mk28 type hydrogen bombs the B-52G carried, three were found on land near Almería, Spain. The non-nuclear explosives in two of the weapons detonated upon impact with the ground, resulting in the contamination of a 2-square-kilometer (490-acre) (0.78 square mile) area by radioactive plutonium. The fourth, which fell into the Mediterranean Sea, was recovered intact after a 2 1/2-month-long search.
- 21 January 1968: the 1968 Thule Air Base B-52 crash involved a United States Air Force (USAF) B-52 bomber. The aircraft was carrying four hydrogen bombs when a cabin fire forced the crew to abandon the aircraft. Six crew members ejected safely, but one who did not have an ejection seat was killed while trying to bail out. The bomber crashed onto sea ice in Greenland, causing the nuclear payload to rupture and disperse, which resulted in widespread radioactive contamination.
- May 1968: Soviet submarine K-27 reactor near meltdown. 9 people died, 83 people were injured.
- In August 1968: Soviet nuclear ballistic missile submarine development program Project 667A. Nuclear-powered Yankee class submarine K-140 was in the naval yard at Severodvinsk for repairs. On August 27, an uncontrolled increase of the reactor's power occurred following work to upgrade the vessel. One of the reactors started up automatically when the control rods were raised to a higher position. Power increased to 18 times its normal amount, while pressure and temperature levels in the reactor increased to four times the normal amount. The automatic start-up of the reactor was caused by the incorrect installation of the control rod electrical cables and by operator error. Radiation levels aboard the vessel deteriorated.
- 10 December 1968: Mayak, former Soviet Union. Criticality accident. Plutonium solution was poured into a cylindrical container with dangerous geometry. One person died, another took a high dose of radiation and radiation sickness, after which he had two legs and his right arm amputated.
- January 1969: Lucens reactor in Switzerland undergoes partial core meltdown leading to massive radioactive contamination of a cavern.

1970s

- 1974–1976: Columbus radiotherapy accident, 10 fatalities, 88 injuries from cobalt-60 source.
- July 1978: Anatoli Bugorski was working on U-70, the largest Soviet particle accelerator, when he accidentally exposed his head directly to the proton beam. He survived, despite suffering some long-term damage.
- July 1979: Church Rock Uranium Mill Spill in New Mexico, USA, when United Nuclear Corporation's uranium mill tailings disposal pond breached its dam. Over 1,000 tons of radioactive mill waste and millions of gallons of mine effluent flowed into the Puerco River, and contaminants traveled downstream.

1980s

- 1980 to 1989: The Kramatorsk radiological accident happened in Kramatorsk, Ukrainian SSR. In 1989, a small capsule containing highly radioactive caesium-137 was found inside the concrete wall of an apartment building. 6 residents of the building died from leukemia and 18 more received varying radiation doses. The accident was detected only after the residents called in a health physicist.
- 1980: Houston radiotherapy accident, 7 fatalities.
- 5 October 1982: Lost radiation source, Baku, Azerbaijan, USSR. 5 fatalities, 13 injuries.
- March 1984: Radiation accident in Morocco, eight fatalities from overexposure to radiation from a lost iridium-192 source.
- 1984:
  - Fernald Feed Materials Production Center gained notoriety when it was learned that the plant was releasing millions of pounds of uranium dust into the atmosphere, causing major radioactive contamination of the surrounding areas. That same year, employee Dave Bocks, a 39-year-old pipefitter, disappeared during the facility's graveyard shift and was later reported missing. Eventually, his remains were discovered inside a uranium processing furnace located in Plant 6.
  - The Ciudad Juárez cobalt-60 contamination incident happened after a private medical company that had illegally purchased a radiation therapy unit sold it to a junkyard to be later smelted to produce rebar. These were distributed and used in multiple cities across Mexico and the United States and exposed an estimated four thousand people to radiation.
- 1985 to 1987: The Therac-25 accidents. A radiation therapy machine was involved in six accidents, in which patients were exposed to massive overdoses of radiation. 4 fatalities, 2 injuries.
- August 1985: Soviet submarine K-431 accident. Ten fatalities and 49 other people suffered radiation injuries.
- 4 January 1986: an overloaded tank at Sequoyah Fuels Corporation ruptured and released 14.5 tons of uranium hexafluoride gas (UF6), causing the death of a worker, the hospitalization of 37 other workers, and approximately 100 downwinders.
- 26 April 1986: Chernobyl disaster: Two killed by debris and 28 killed by acute radiation sickness after human error caused the meltdown of a reactor and causing long-term health effects, including thyroid cancer, psychological trauma, and increased suicide risk among some affected populations, although the total number of radiation-related deaths remains uncertain.
- October 1986: Soviet submarine K-219 reactor almost had a meltdown. Sergei Preminin died after he manually lowered the control rods, and stopped the explosion. The submarine sank three days later.
- September 1987: Goiania accident. Four fatalities, and following radiological screening of more than 100,000 people, it was ascertained that 249 people received serious radiation contamination from exposure to caesium-137. In the cleanup operation, topsoil had to be removed from several sites, and several houses were demolished. All the objects from within those houses were removed and examined. Time magazine has identified the accident as one of the world's "worst nuclear disasters" and the International Atomic Energy Agency called it "one of the world's worst radiological incidents".
- 1989: San Salvador, El Salvador; one fatality due to violation of safety rules at cobalt-60 irradiation facility.

1990s

- 1990: Soreq, Israel; one fatality due to violation of safety rules at cobalt-60 irradiation facility.
- December 16, 1990: radiotherapy accident in Zaragoza. Eleven fatalities and 27 other patients were injured.
- 1991: Neswizh, Belarus; one fatality due to violation of safety rules at cobalt-60 irradiation facility.
- 1992: Jilin, China; three fatalities at cobalt-60 irradiation facility.
- 1992: USA; one fatality.
- April 1993: accident at the Tomsk-7 Reprocessing Complex, when a tank exploded while being cleaned with nitric acid. The explosion released a cloud of radioactive gas. (INES level 4).
- 1994: Tammiku, Estonia; one fatality from disposed caesium-137 source.
- August — December 1996: Radiotherapy accident in Costa Rica. Thirteen fatalities and 114 other patients received an overdose of radiation.
- 1996: an accident at Pelindaba research facility in South Africa results in the exposure of workers to radiation. Harold Daniels and several others die from cancers and radiation burns related to the exposure.
- June 1997: Sarov, Russia; one fatality due to violation of safety rules.
- May 1998: The Acerinox accident was an incident of radioactive contamination in Southern Spain. A caesium-137 source managed to pass through the monitoring equipment in an Acerinox scrap metal reprocessing plant. When melted, the caesium-137 caused the release of a radioactive cloud.
- September 1999: two fatalities at criticality accident at Tokaimura nuclear accident (Japan)

2000s

- January–February 2000: Samut Prakan radiation accident: three deaths and ten injuries resulted in Samut Prakan when a cobalt-60 radiation-therapy unit was dismantled.
- May 2000: Meet Halfa, Egypt; two fatalities due to radiography accident.
- August 2000 – March 2001: Instituto Oncologico Nacional of Panama, 17 fatalities. Patients receiving treatment for prostate cancer and cancer of the cervix receive lethal doses of radiation.
- 9 August 2004: Mihama Nuclear Power Plant accident, 4 fatalities. Hot water and steam leaked from a broken pipe (not actually a radiation accident).
- 9 May 2005: it was announced that the Thermal Oxide Reprocessing Plant at Sellafield in the UK suffered a leak of a highly radioactive solution, into secondary containment.

2010s

- April 2010: Mayapuri radiological accident, India, one fatality after a cobalt-60 research irradiator was sold to a scrap metal dealer and dismantled.
- March 2011: Fukushima I nuclear accidents, Japan and the radioactive discharge at the Fukushima Daiichi Power Station.
- 17 January 2014: At the Rössing Uranium Mine, Namibia, a catastrophic structural failure of a leach tank resulted in a major spill. The France-based laboratory, CRIIRAD, reported elevated levels of radioactive materials in the area surrounding the mine. Workers were not informed of the dangers of working with radioactive materials and the health effects thereof.
- 1 February 2014: Designed to last ten thousand years, the Waste Isolation Pilot Plant (WIPP) site approximately 26 miles (42 km) east of Carlsbad, New Mexico, United States, had its first leak of airborne radioactive materials. 140 employees working underground at the time were sheltered indoors. Thirteen of these tested positive for internal radioactive contamination increasing their risk for future cancers or health issues. A second leak at the plant occurred shortly after the first, releasing plutonium and other radiotoxins causing concern to nearby communities. The source of the drum rupture has been traced to the use of organic kitty litter at the WCRRF packaging facility at Los Alamos National Laboratory, where the drum was packaged and prepared for shipment.
- 8 August 2019: Nyonoksa radiation accident at the State Central Navy Testing Range at Nyonoksa, near Severodvinsk, Russia.

== Worldwide nuclear weapons testing summary ==
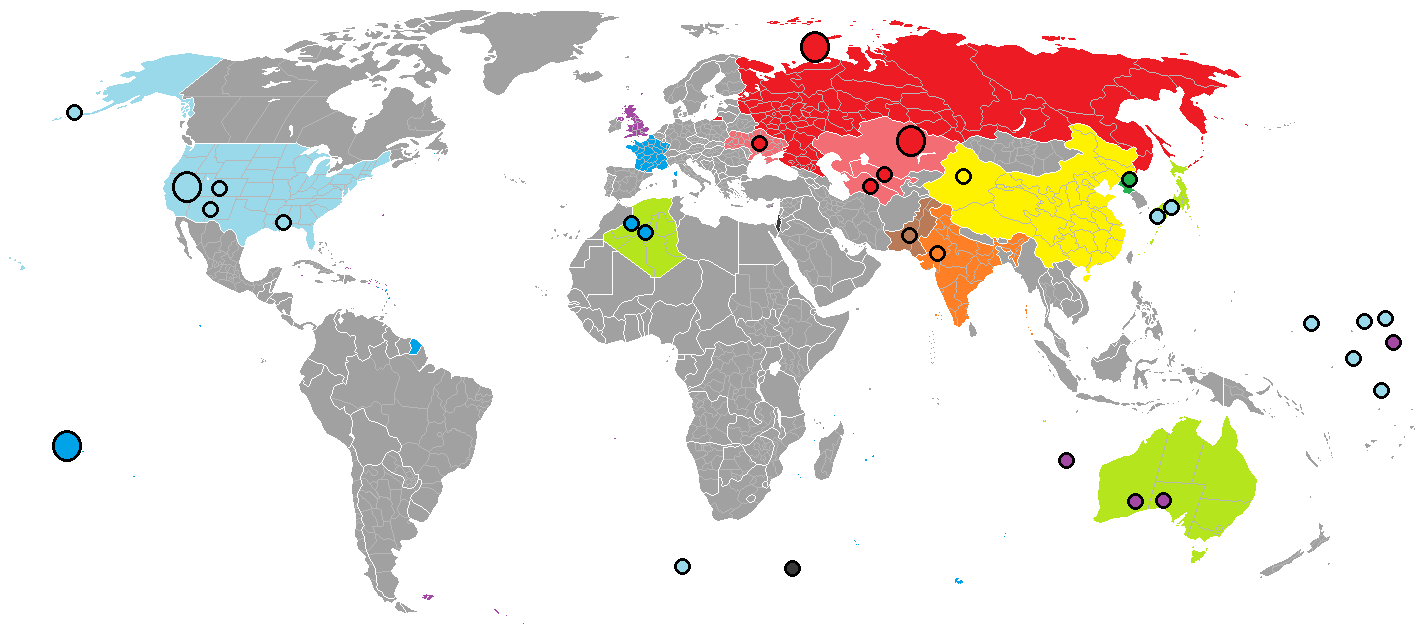
Over 2,000 nuclear tests have been conducted, in over a dozen different sites around the world. Red Russia/Soviet Union, blue France, light blue United States, violet the United Kingdom, black Israel, yellow China, orange India, brown Pakistan, green North Korea and light green territories exposed to bombs

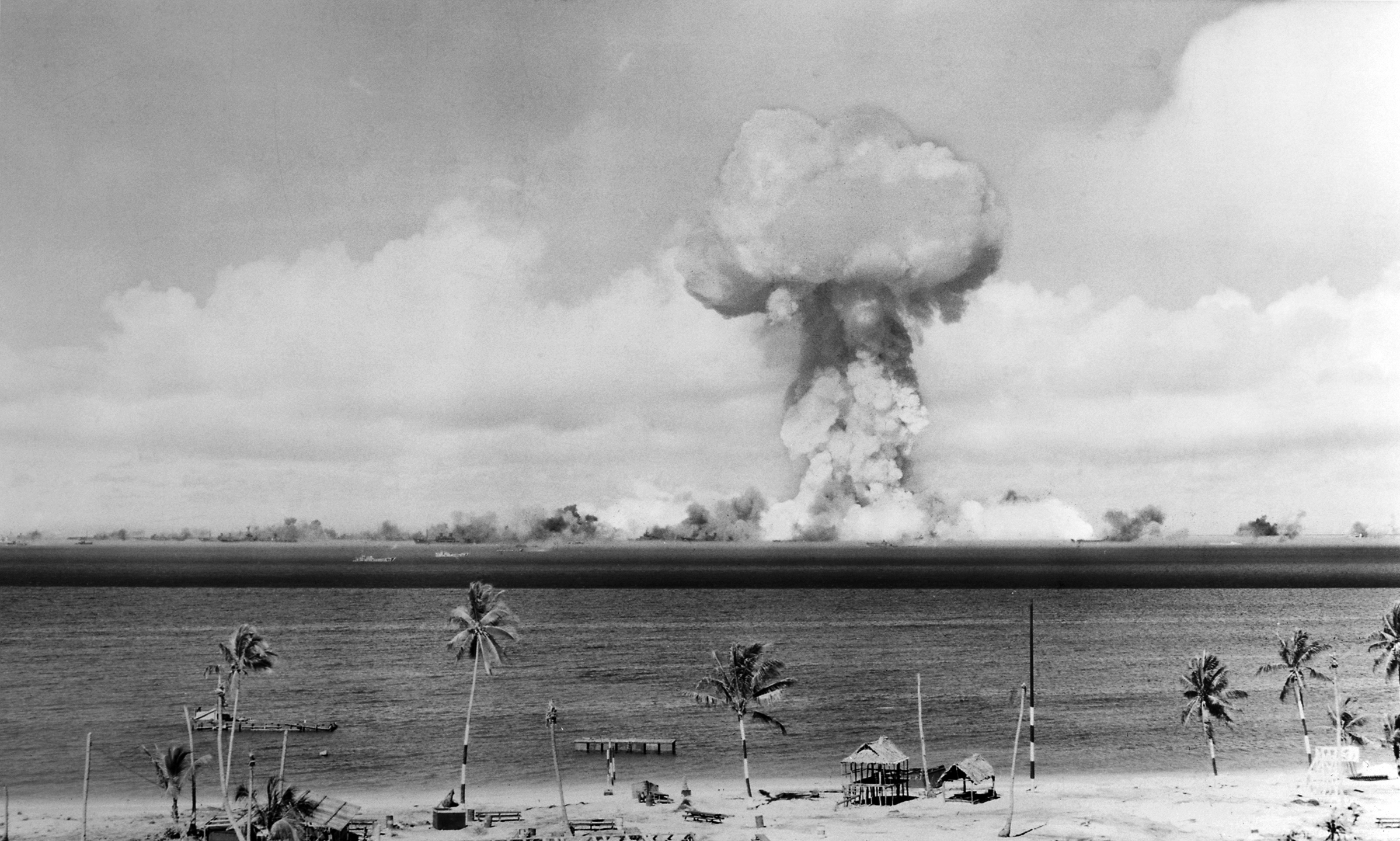
Operation Crossroads Test Able, a 23-kiloton air-deployed nuclear weapon detonated on July 1, 1946.

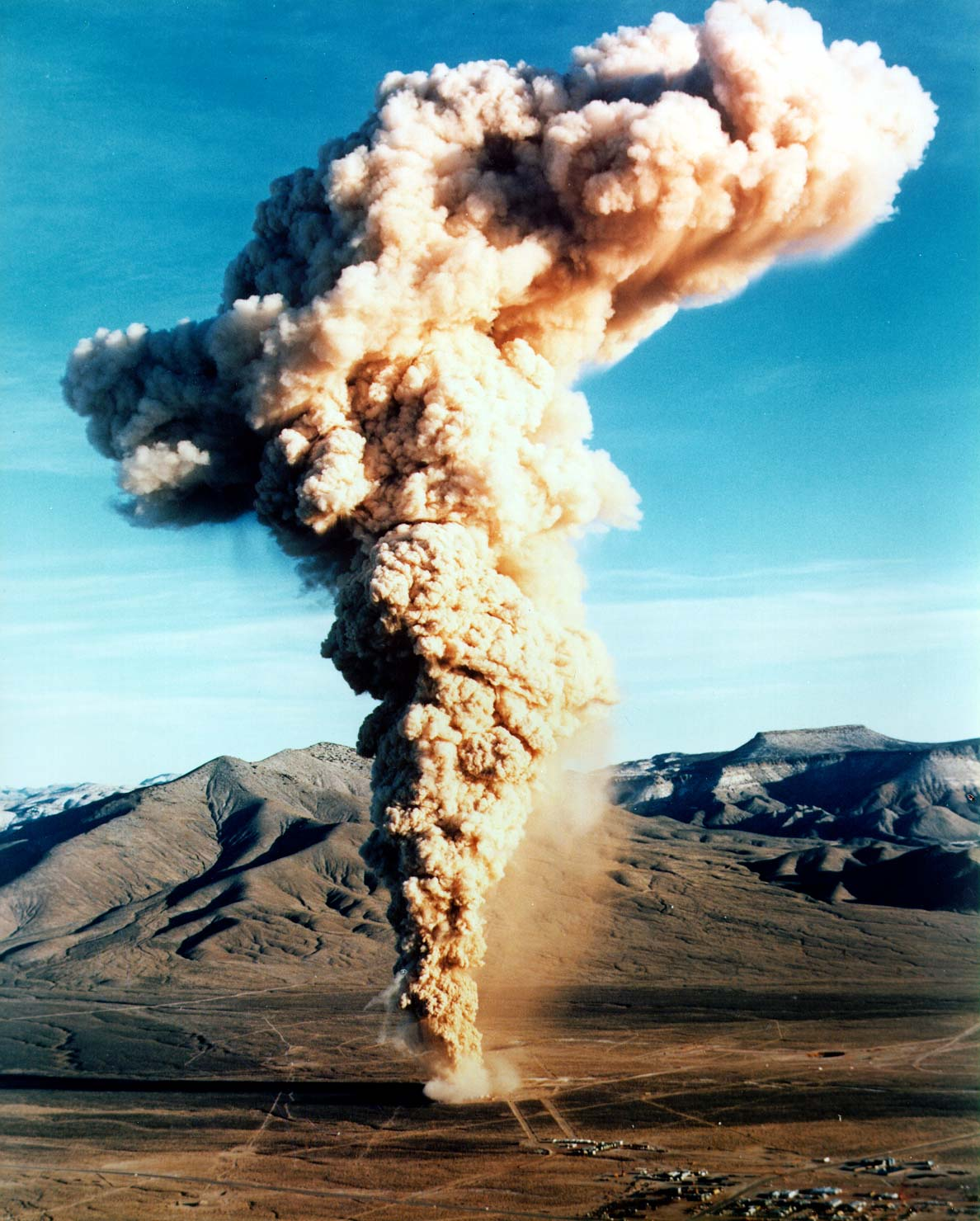
Radioactive materials were accidentally released from the 1970 Baneberry Nuclear Test at the Nevada Test Site.

Between 16 July 1945 and 23 September 1992, the United States maintained a program of vigorous nuclear weapons testing, with the exception of a moratorium between November 1958 and September 1961. By official count, a total of 1,054 nuclear tests and two nuclear attacks were conducted, with over 100 of them taking place at sites in the Pacific Ocean, over 900 of them at the Nevada Test Site, and ten on miscellaneous sites in the United States (Alaska, Colorado, Mississippi, and New Mexico). Until November 1962, the vast majority of the U.S. tests were atmospheric (that is, above-ground); after the acceptance of the Partial Test Ban Treaty all testing was regulated underground, in order to prevent the dispersion of nuclear fallout.

The U.S. program of atmospheric nuclear testing exposed a number of the population to the hazards of fallout. Estimating exact numbers, and the exact consequences, of people exposed has been medically very difficult, with the exception of the high exposures of Marshall Islanders and Japanese fishers in the case of the Castle Bravo incident in 1954. A number of groups of U.S. citizens — especially farmers and inhabitants of cities downwind of the Nevada Test Site and U.S. military workers at various tests — have sued for compensation and recognition of their exposure, many successfully. The passage of the Radiation Exposure Compensation Act of 1990 allowed for a systematic filing of compensation claims in relation to testing as well as those employed at nuclear weapons facilities. As of June 2009 over $1.4 billion total has been given in compensation, with over $660 million going to "downwinders".

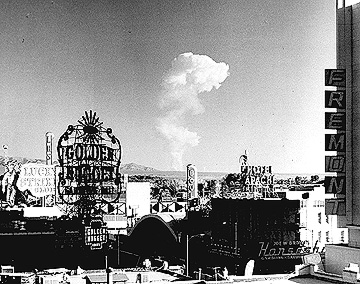
This view of downtown Las Vegas shows a mushroom cloud in the background. Scenes such as this were typical during the 1950s. From 1951 to 1962 the government conducted 100 atmospheric tests at the nearby Nevada Test Site.

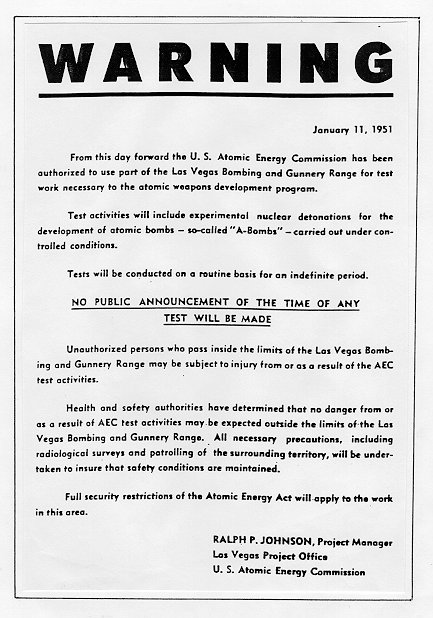
This handbill was distributed 16 days before the first nuclear device was detonated at the Nevada Test Site.

== Trafficking and thefts ==
The International Atomic Energy Agency says there is "a persistent problem with the illicit trafficking in nuclear and other radioactive materials, thefts, losses and other unauthorized activities". The IAEA Illicit Nuclear Trafficking Database notes 1,266 incidents reported by 99 countries over the last 12 years, including 18 incidents involving HEU or plutonium trafficking:

- Security specialist Shaun Gregory argued in an article that terrorists have attacked Pakistani nuclear facilities three times in the recent past; twice in 2007 and once in 2008.
- In November 2007, burglars with unknown intentions infiltrated the Pelindaba nuclear research facility near Pretoria, South Africa. The burglars escaped without acquiring any of the uranium held at the facility.
- In February 2006, Oleg Khinsagov of Russia was arrested in Georgia, along with three Georgian accomplices, with 79.5 grams of 89 percent enriched HEU.
- The Alexander Litvinenko poisoning in November 2006 with radioactive polonium "represents an ominous landmark: the beginning of an era of nuclear terrorism," according to Andrew J. Patterson.

== Accident categories ==
=== Nuclear meltdown/core damage ===
A nuclear meltdown is a severe nuclear reactor accident that results in severe reactor core damage from overheating. It has been defined as the accidental melting of the core of a nuclear reactor, and refers to the core's either complete or partial collapse. A core melt accident occurs when the heat generated by a nuclear reactor exceeds the heat removed by the cooling systems to the point where at least one nuclear fuel element exceeds its melting point. This differs from a fuel element failure, which is not caused by high temperatures. A meltdown may be caused by a loss of coolant, loss of coolant pressure, or low coolant flow rate or be the result of a criticality excursion in which the reactor is operated at a power level that exceeds its design limits. Alternately, an external fire may endanger the core, leading to a meltdown. A Core damage accident is a somewhat less severe accident where the core doesn't melt down, but is damaged and has been saved before beginning to melt down. In a wider sense of the Probabilistic risk assessment (PRA), the term core damage includes all core melts.

Large-scale nuclear meltdowns at civilian nuclear power plants include:

- the Three Mile Island accident in Pennsylvania, United States, in 1979.
- the Chernobyl disaster at Chernobyl Nuclear Power Plant, Ukraine, USSR, in 1986.
- the Fukushima Daiichi nuclear disaster following the earthquake and tsunami in Japan, March 2011.

Other core meltdowns or core damages have occurred at:

- NRX (military), Ontario, Canada, in 1952
- BORAX-I (experimental), Idaho, United States, in 1954
- EBR-I, Idaho, United States, in 1955
- Windscale (military), Sellafield, England, in 1957 (see Windscale fire)
- Sodium Reactor Experiment, Santa Susana Field Laboratory (civilian), California, United States, in 1959
- Fermi 1 (civilian), Michigan, United States, in 1966
- Chapelcross nuclear power station (civilian), Scotland, in 1967
- the Lucens reactor, Switzerland, in 1969.
- Saint-Laurent Nuclear Power Plant (civilian), France, in 1969
- A1 plant, (civilian) at Jaslovské Bohunice, Czechoslovakia, in 1977
- Saint-Laurent Nuclear Power Plant (civilian), France, in 1980
- Several Soviet Navy nuclear submarines have had nuclear core melts: K-19 (1961), K-11(1965), K-27 (1968), K-140 (1968), K-222 (1980), and K-431 (1985, Criticality accident).; the same problem happened on the Lenin icebreaker.

=== Criticality accidents ===
A criticality accident (also sometimes referred to as an "excursion" or "power excursion") occurs when a nuclear chain reaction is accidentally allowed to occur in fissile material, such as enriched uranium or plutonium. The Chernobyl accident is not universally regarded an example of a criticality accident, because it occurred in an operating reactor at a power plant. The reactor was supposed to be in a controlled critical state, but control of the chain reaction was lost and it ran away. The accident destroyed the reactor and left a large geographic area uninhabitable. In a smaller scale accident at Sarov a technician working with highly enriched uranium was irradiated while preparing an experiment involving a sphere of fissile material. The Sarov accident is interesting because the system remained critical for many days before it could be stopped, though safely located in a shielded experimental hall. This is an example of a limited scope accident where only a few people can be harmed, while no release of radioactivity into the environment occurred. A criticality accident with limited off site release of both radiation (gamma and neutron) and a very small release of radioactivity occurred at Tokaimura in 1999 during the production of enriched uranium fuel. Two workers died, a third was permanently injured, and 350 citizens were exposed to radiation. In 2016, a criticality accident was reported at the Afrikantov OKBM Critical Test Facility in Russia.

=== Decay heat ===
Decay heat accidents are where the heat generated by radioactive decay causes harm. In a large nuclear reactor, a loss of coolant accident can damage the core: for example, at Three Mile Island Nuclear Generating Station a recent shutdown (SCRAMed) PWR reactor was left for a length of time without cooling water. As a result, the nuclear fuel was damaged, and the core partially melted. The removal of the decay heat is a significant reactor safety concern, especially shortly after shutdown. Failure to remove decay heat may cause the reactor core temperature to rise to dangerous levels and has caused nuclear accidents. The heat removal is usually achieved through several redundant and diverse systems, and the heat is often dissipated to an 'ultimate heat sink' which has a large capacity and requires no active power, though this method is typically used after decay heat has reduced to a very small value. The main cause of the release of radioactivity in the Three Mile Island accident was a pilot-operated relief valve on the primary loop which stuck in the open position. This caused the overflow tank into which it drained to rupture and release large amounts of radioactive cooling water into the containment building.

For the most part, nuclear facilities receive their power from offsite electrical systems. They also have a grid of emergency backup generators to provide power in the event of an outage. An event that could prevent both offsite power, as well as emergency power is known as a "station blackout". In 2011, an earthquake and tsunami caused a loss of electric power at the Fukushima Daiichi nuclear power plant in Japan (via severing the connection to the external grid and destroying the backup diesel generators). The decay heat could not be removed, and the reactor cores of units 1, 2 and 3 overheated, the nuclear fuel melted, and the containments were breached. Radioactive materials were released from the plant to the atmosphere and to the ocean.

=== Transport ===
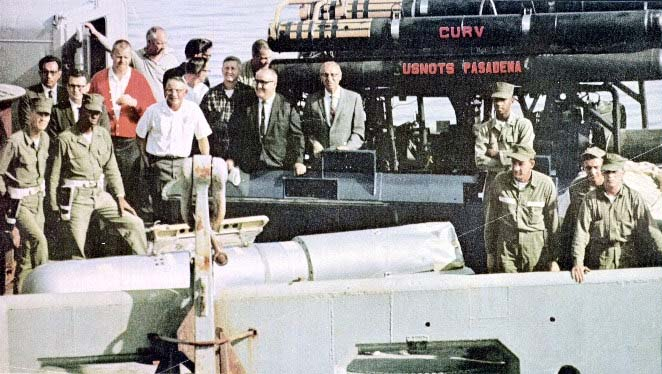
The recovered thermonuclear bomb was displayed by U.S. Navy officials on the fantail of the submarine rescue ship U.S.S. Petrel after it was located in the sea off the coast of Spain at a depth of 762 meters and recovered in April 1966

Transport accidents can cause a release of radioactivity resulting in contamination or shielding to be damaged resulting in direct irradiation. In Cochabamba a defective gamma radiography set was transported in a passenger bus as cargo. The gamma source was outside the shielding, and it irradiated some bus passengers.

In the United Kingdom, it was revealed in a court case that in March 2002 a radiotherapy source was transported from Leeds to Sellafield with defective shielding. The shielding had a gap on the underside. It is thought that no human has been seriously harmed by the escaping radiation.

On 17 January 1966, a fatal collision occurred between a B-52G and a KC-135 Stratotanker over Palomares, Spain (see 1966 Palomares B-52 crash). The accident was designated a "Broken Arrow", meaning an accident involving a nuclear weapon that does not present a risk of war.

=== Equipment failure ===
Equipment failure is one possible type of accident. In Białystok, Poland, in 2001 the electronics associated with a particle accelerator used for the treatment of cancer suffered a malfunction. This then led to the overexposure of at least one patient. While the initial failure was the simple failure of a semiconductor diode, it set in motion a series of events which led to a radiation injury.

A related cause of accidents is failure of control software, as in the cases involving the Therac-25 medical radiotherapy equipment: the elimination of a hardware safety interlock in a new design model exposed a previously undetected bug in the control software, which could have led to patients receiving massive overdoses under a specific set of conditions.

=== Human error ===
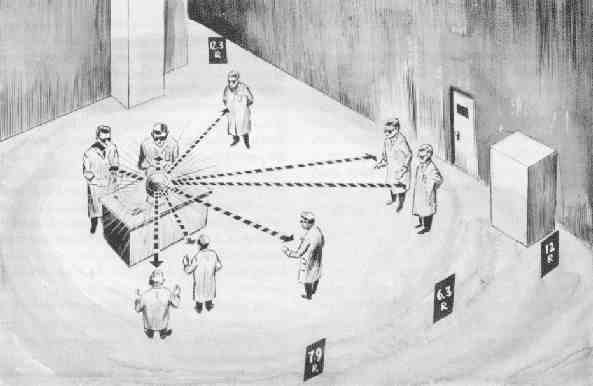
A sketch used by doctors to determine the amount of radiation to which each person had been exposed during the Slotin excursion

Some major nuclear accidents were attributable in part to operator or human error. At Chernobyl, operators deviated from test procedure and allowed certain reactor parameters to exceed design limits. At TMI-2, operators permitted thousands of gallons of water to escape from the reactor plant before observing that the coolant pumps were behaving abnormally. The coolant pumps were thus turned off to protect the pumps, which in turn led to the destruction of the reactor itself as cooling was completely lost within the core.

A detailed investigation into SL-1 determined that one operator (perhaps inadvertently) manually pulled the 84-pound (38 kg) central control rod out about 26 inches rather than the maintenance procedure's intention of about 4 inches.

An assessment conducted by the Commissariat à l'Énergie Atomique (CEA) in France concluded that no amount of technical innovation can eliminate the risk of human-induced errors associated with the operation of nuclear power plants. Two types of mistakes were deemed most serious: errors committed during field operations, such as maintenance and testing, that can cause an accident; and human errors made during small accidents that cascade to complete failure.

In 1946, Canadian Manhattan Project physicist Louis Slotin performed a risky experiment known as "tickling the dragon's tail" which involved two hemispheres of neutron-reflective beryllium being brought together around a plutonium core to bring it to criticality. Against operating procedures, the hemispheres were separated only by a screwdriver. The screwdriver slipped and set off a chain reaction criticality accident filling the room with harmful radiation and a flash of blue light (caused by excited, ionized air particles returning to their unexcited states). Slotin reflexively separated the hemispheres in reaction to the heat flash and blue light, preventing further irradiation of several co-workers present in the room. However, Slotin absorbed a lethal dose of the radiation and died nine days later. The infamous plutonium mass used in the experiment was referred to as the demon core.

=== Lost source ===
Lost source accidents, also referred to as orphan sources, are incidents in which a radioactive source is lost, stolen or abandoned. The source then might cause harm to humans. The best known example of this type of event is the 1987 Goiânia accident in Brazil, when a radiotherapy source was forgotten and abandoned in a hospital, to be later stolen and opened by scavengers. A similar case occurred in 2000 in Samut Prakan, Thailand when the radiation source of an expired teletherapy unit was sold unregistered, and stored in an unguarded car park from which it was stolen. Other cases occurred at Yanango, Peru where a radiography source was lost, and Gilan, Iran where a radiography source harmed a welder.

The International Atomic Energy Agency has provided guides for scrap metal collectors on what a sealed source might look like. The scrap metal industry is the one where lost sources are most likely to be found.

Experts believe that up to 50 nuclear weapons were lost during the Cold War.

== Comparisons ==
Hypothetical number of global deaths which would have resulted from energy production if the world's energy production was met through a single source, in 2014.

Comparing the historical safety record of civilian nuclear energy with other forms of electrical generation, Ball, Roberts, and Simpson, the IAEA, and the Paul Scherrer Institute found in separate studies that during the period from 1970 to 1992, there were just 39 on-the-job deaths of nuclear power plant workers worldwide, while during the same time period, there were 6,400 on-the-job deaths of coal power plant workers, 1,200 on-the-job deaths of natural gas power plant workers and members of the general public caused by natural gas power plants, and 4,000 deaths of members of the general public caused by hydroelectric power plants with failure of Banqiao Dam in 1975 resulting in 170,000-230,000 fatalities alone.

As other common sources of energy, coal power plants are estimated to kill 24,000 Americans per year due to lung disease as well as causing 40,000 heart attacks per year in the United States. According to Scientific American, the average coal power plant emits 100 times more radiation per year than a comparatively sized nuclear power plant in the form of toxic coal waste known as fly ash.

In terms of energy accidents, hydroelectric plants were responsible for the most fatalities, but nuclear power plant accidents rank first in terms of their economic cost, accounting for 41 percent of all property damage. Oil and hydroelectric follow at around 25 percent each, followed by natural gas at 9 percent and coal at 2 percent. Excluding Chernobyl and the Shimantan Dam, the three other most expensive accidents involved the Exxon Valdez oil spill (Alaska), the Prestige oil spill (Spain), and the Three Mile Island nuclear accident (Pennsylvania).

== Nuclear safety ==
Nuclear safety covers the actions taken to prevent nuclear and radiation accidents or to limit their consequences and damage to the environment. This covers nuclear power plants as well as all other nuclear facilities, the transportation of nuclear materials, and the use and storage of nuclear materials for medical, power, industry, and military uses.

The nuclear power industry has improved the safety and performance of reactors, and has proposed new safer (but generally untested) reactor designs but there is no guarantee that the reactors will be designed, built and operated correctly. Mistakes do occur and the designers of reactors at Fukushima in Japan did not anticipate that a tsunami generated by an earthquake would disable the backup systems that were supposed to stabilize the reactor after the earthquake. According to UBS AG, the Fukushima I nuclear accidents have cast doubt on whether even an advanced economy like Japan can master nuclear safety. Catastrophic scenarios involving terrorist attacks are also conceivable.

In his book Normal Accidents, Charles Perrow says that unexpected failures are built into society's complex and tightly coupled nuclear reactor systems. Nuclear power plants cannot be operated without some major accidents. Such accidents are unavoidable and cannot be designed around. An interdisciplinary team from MIT have estimated that given the expected growth of nuclear power from 2005 to 2055, at least four serious nuclear accidents would be expected in that period. There have been five serious accidents (core damage) in the world since 1970 (one at Three Mile Island in 1979; one at Chernobyl in 1986; and three at Fukushima-Daiichi in 2011), corresponding to the beginning of the operation of generation II reactors. This leads to on average one serious accident happening every eight years worldwide.

When nuclear reactors begin to age, they require more exhaustive monitoring and preventive maintenance and tests to operate safely and prevent accidents. However, these measures can be costly, and some reactor owners have not followed these recommendations. Most of the existing nuclear infrastructure in use is old due to these reasons.

To combat accidents associated with aging nuclear power plants, it may be advantageous to build new nuclear power reactors and retire the old nuclear plants. In the United States alone, more than 50 start-up companies are working to create innovative designs for nuclear power plants while ensuring the plants are more affordable and cost-effective.

== Ecological impacts ==
=== Impact on land ===
Isotopes released during a meltdown or related event are typically dispersed into the atmosphere and then settle on the surface through natural occurrences and deposition. Isotopes settling on the top soil layer can remain there for many years, due to their slow decay (long half-life). The long-term detrimental effects on agriculture, farming, and livestock, can potentially affect human health and safety long after the actual event.

After the Fukushima Daiichi accident in 2011, surrounding agricultural areas were contaminated with more than 100,000 MBq km^{−2} in cesium concentrations. As a result, eastern Fukushima food production was severely limited. Due to Japan's topography and the local weather patterns, cesium deposits as well as other isotopes reside in top layer of soils all over eastern and northeastern Japan. Luckily, mountain ranges have shielded western Japan.

The Chernobyl disaster in 1986 exposed to radiation about 125,000 mi^{2} (320,000 km^{2}) of land across Ukraine, Belarus, and Russia. The amount of focused radiation caused severe damage to plant reproduction: most plants could not reproduce for at least three years. Many of these occurrences on land can be a result of the distribution of radioactive isotopes through water systems.

=== Impact on water ===
==== Fukushima Daiichi accident ====
In 2013, contaminated groundwater was found in between some of the affected turbine buildings in the Fukushima Daiichi facility, including locations at bordering seaports on the Pacific Ocean. In both locations, the facility typically releases clean water to feed into further groundwater systems. The Tokyo Electric Power Company (TEPCO), the entity that manages and operates the facility, further investigated the contamination in areas that would be deemed safe to conduct operations. They found that a significant amount of the contamination originated from underground cable trenches that connected to circulation pumps within the facility. Both the International Atomic Energy Agency (IAEA) and TEPCO confirmed that this contamination was a result of the 2011 earthquake. Due to damage like this, the Fukushima plant released nuclear material into the Pacific Ocean and has continued to do so. After 5 years of leaking, the contaminates reached all corners of the Pacific Ocean, from North America and Australia to Patagonia. Along the same coastline, Woods Hole Oceanographic Institution (WHOI) found trace amounts of Fukushima contaminates 100 miles (150 km) off the coast of Eureka, California in November 2014. Despite the relatively dramatic increases in radiation, the contamination levels still satisfy the World Health Organization's (WHO's) standard for clean drinking water.

In 2019, the Japanese government announced that it was considering the possibility of dumping contaminated water from the Fukushima reactor into the Pacific Ocean. Japanese Environmental Minister Yoshiaki Harada reported that TEPCO had collected over a million tons of contaminated water, and by 2022 they would be out of space to safely store the radioactive water.

Multiple private agencies as well as various North American governments monitor the spread of radiation throughout the Pacific to track the potential hazards it can introduce to food systems, groundwater supplies, and ecosystems. In 2014, the United States Food and Drug Administration (FDA) released a report stating that radionuclides, traced from the Fukushima facility, were present in the United States food supply, but not to levels deemed to be a threat to public health – as well as any food and agricultural products imported from Japanese sources. It is commonly believed that, with the rate of the current radionuclide leakage, the dispersal into the water would prove beneficial, as most of the isotopes would be diluted by the water as well as become less radioactive over time, due to radioactive decay. Cesium (Cs-137) is the primary isotope released from the Fukushima Daiichi facility. Cs-137 has a long half-life, meaning it could potentially have long-term harmful effects, but as of now, its levels from 200 km outside of Fukushima show close to pre-accident levels, with little spread to North American coasts.

==== Chernobyl accident ====
Evidence can be seen from the 1986 Chernobyl event. Due to the violent nature of the accident there, a sizable portion of the resulting radioactive contamination of the atmosphere consisted of particles that were dispersed during the explosion. Many of these contaminates settled in groundwater systems in immediate surrounding areas, but also in Russia and Belarus. The ecological effects of the resulting radiation in groundwater can be seen in various aspects in the area affected by the sequence of environmental consequences. Radionuclides carried by groundwater systems have resulted in the uptake of radioactive material in plants and then up the food chains into animals, and eventually humans. One of the most important mechanisms of exposure to radiation was through agriculture contaminated by radioactive groundwater. Again, one of the greatest concerns for the population within the 30 km exclusion zone is the intake of Cs-137 by consuming agricultural products contaminated with groundwater. Thanks to the environmental and soil conditions outside the exclusion zone, the recorded levels are below those that require remediation, based on a survey in 1996. During this event, radioactive material was transported by groundwater across borders into neighboring countries. In Belarus, just north of Chernobyl, about 250,000 hectares of previously usable farmland were held by state officials until deemed safe.

Off-site radiological risk may be found in the form of flooding. Many citizens in the surrounding areas have been deemed at risk of exposure to radiation due to the Chernobyl reactor's proximity to floodplains. A study was conducted in 1996 to see how far the radioactive effects were felt across eastern Europe. Lake Kojanovskoe in Russia, 250 km from the Chernobyl accident site, was found to be one of the most impacted lakes. Fish collected from the lake were found to be 60 times more radioactive than the European Union Standard. Further investigation found that the water source feeding the lake provided drinking water for about 9 million Ukrainians, as well as providing agricultural irrigation and food for 23 million more. The disaster has been described by lawyers, academics and journalists as an example of ecocide.

A cover was constructed around the damage reactor of the Chernobyl nuclear plant. This helps in the remediation of radioactive material leaking from the site of the accident, but does little to protect the local area from radioactive isotopes that were dispersed in its soils and waterways more than 30 years ago. Partially due to the already abandoned urban areas, as well as international relations currently affecting the country, remediation efforts have minimized compared to the initial clean up actions and more recent accidents such as the Fukushima incident. On-site laboratories, monitoring wells, and meteorological stations can be found in a monitoring role at key locations affected by the accident.

=== Effects of acute radiation exposure ===
Phase	Symptom	Whole-body absorbed dose (Gy)				
Phase	Symptom	1–2 Gy	2–6 Gy	6–8 Gy	8–30 Gy	> 30 Gy
Immediate	Nausea and vomiting	5–50%	50–100%	75–100%	90–100%	100%
Immediate	Time of onset	2–6 h	1–2 h	10–60 min	< 10 min	Minutes
Immediate	Duration	< 24 h	24–48 h	< 48 h	< 48 h	—N/a (patients die in < 48 h)
Immediate	Diarrhea	None	None to mild (< 10%)	Heavy (> 10%)	Heavy (> 95%)	Heavy (100%)
Immediate	Time of onset	—	3–8 h	1–3 h	< 1 h	< 1 h
Immediate	Headache	Slight	Mild to moderate (50%)	Moderate (80%)	Severe (80–90%)	Severe (100%)
Immediate	Time of onset	—	4–24 h	3–4 h	1–2 h	< 1 h
Immediate	Fever	None	Moderate increase (10–100%)	Moderate to severe (100%)	Severe (100%)	Severe (100%)
Immediate	Time of onset	—	1–3 h	< 1 h	< 1 h	< 1 h
Immediate	CNS function	No impairment	Cognitive impairment 6–20 h	Cognitive impairment > 24 h	Rapid incapacitation	Seizures, tremor, ataxia, lethargy
Latent period		28–31 days	7–28 days	< 7 days	None	None
Illness		Mild to moderate leukopenia Fatigue; Weakness	Moderate to severe leukopenia Purpura; Hemorrhage; Infections; Alopecia after 3 Gy	Severe leukopenia High fever Diarrhea; Vomiting; Dizziness and disorientation Hypotension; Electrolyte disturbance	Nausea; Vomiting; Severe diarrhea High fever Electrolyte disturbance Shock	—N/a (patients die in < 48h)
Mortality	Without care	0–5%	5–95%	95–100%	100%	100%
Mortality	With care	0–5%	5–50%	50–100%	99–100%	100%
Mortality	Death	6–8 weeks	4–6 weeks	2–4 weeks	2 days – 2 weeks	1–2 days
Table source

=== Effects of lower doses of radiation ===
It's empirically observed that ionizing radiation leads to higher probability of potentially developing cancer. Epidemiological studies therefore use for example the term latent cancer fatalities (LCF).

== See also ==
- 1983 Soviet nuclear false alarm incident
- Acute radiation syndrome
- Clinic of Zaragoza radiotherapy accident
- Consequences of the Chernobyl disaster in France
- Category:Deaths by acute radiation syndrome
- European Committee on Radiation Risk
- Genpatsu-shinsai
- International Nuclear Event Scale
- List of military nuclear accidents
- List of nuclear whistleblowers
- Nuclear power debate
- Radiation poisoning (disambiguation)
