= 1984 Moroccan radiation accident =

1984 radiation accident in Morocco

In March 1984, a serious radiation accident occurred in Morocco at a Mohammedia factory, where eight people died from pulmonary hemorrhaging caused by overexposure to radiation from a lost iridium-192 pellet. Other individuals also received significant overdoses of radiation that required medical attention. Three people were sent to the Curie Institute in Paris for treatment of radiation poisoning.

The source was used to radiograph welds and became separated from its shielded container. As the source itself had no markings indicating it was radioactive, a worker took it home, where it stayed for some weeks, exposing the family to radiation. The laborer, his family, and some relatives were the eight deaths caused by the accident.

== See also ==
- Nuclear and radiation accidents
- Goiânia accident
- Radiotherapy accident in Costa Rica
- Radiotherapy accident in Zaragoza
