= Columbus radiotherapy accident =

Radiotherapy accident in Columbus, Ohio

A radiotherapy accident in Columbus, Ohio, also known as the Riverside radiation case, occurred as the result of an incorrectly calibrated cobalt teletherapy unit, occurred between 1974 and 1976, leading to 10 deaths.

== Background ==
Between 1958 and 1972, the Riverside Methodist Hospital in Columbus, Ohio became the first hospital in Central Ohio to develop an extensive cobalt therapy program, where the use of cobalt-60 became the dominant radiation source for treating patients with cancer. In 1973, 30-year-old Joel Axt was hired by the hospital as the resident physicist, as part of a plan to further expand the hospital's radiation therapy program. Axt was previously a teacher at the Xavier University of Louisiana, and had clinical experience at the University of California Medical Center, though his experience was limited to 14 months and was not enough to qualify for American Board of Radiology certification. After Axt's arrival, he had to "reconstruct Riverside's radiation physics program almost from scratch," as the previous contracted physicist had removed all his equipment.

== Incident ==
In 1974, Axt calibrated a cobalt-60 teletherapy unit with an incorrect decay curve. The calculated decay rate was more rapid than the real source, leading to a dose rate underestimated by 10–45% and an overestimated treatment time. No other calibrations and checks were performed between May 1974 and January 1976. Axt later attributed it to his other demanding responsibilities and high-priority projects at the hospital. By January 1976, patients had been complaining about what would be symptoms of radiation overexposure. A radiation therapist prompted Axt to make a measurement of the output, revealing Axt's mistake, and the teletherapy unit was adjusted. In March, the hospital asked an external team from the MD Anderson Cancer Center to review the accident. After the accident was leaked to the public in April, the Nuclear Regulatory Commission began its own investigation.

During the investigations, Axt attributed the high output measured to a faulty measurement system, and produced ten calibration documents to support this theory, though under further investigations he admitted that he had falsified his reports. Nine out of ten of Axt's reports were found to be fabricated.

Over a 22-month period, 426 patients received significant overdoses. Around three hundred of the patients died within a year, mainly due to their pre-existing cancer. Of the 183 patients who survived the first year, 88 showed "immediate severe complications related to the irradiated sites." 10 fatalities were known.

As a result of this accident, the Nuclear Regulatory Commission issued extensive regulations on the training requirements, and quality assurance procedures required when using cobalt-60 machines. 102 lawsuits have been filed by the survivors and families of the deceased. Axt was fired and disappeared, but he was later found in Miami, and took a deposition in 1977.

== See also ==
- List of civilian radiation accidents
- 1996 San Juan de Dios radiotherapy accident
- Clinic of Zaragoza radiotherapy accident
