= Ciudad Juárez cobalt-60 contamination incident =

1984 Mexican radiation incident

A radioactive contamination incident occurred in 1984 in Ciudad Juárez, Mexico, originating from a radiation therapy unit purchased by a private medical company and subsequently dismantled for lack of personnel to operate it. The radioactive material, cobalt-60, ended up in a junkyard, where it was sold to foundries that inadvertently melted it with other metals and produced about 6,000 tons of contaminated rebar. These were distributed in 17 Mexican states and several cities in the United States. It is estimated that 4,000 people were exposed to radiation as a result of this incident.

== Accident ==
=== Events ===
In November 1977, the Centro Médico de Especialidades, a private hospital in Ciudad Juárez, Chihuahua, purchased a Picker C-3000 radiotherapy unit containing approximately 6,000 cobalt-60 pellets of 2.6 GBq each, which had been introduced to Mexico without complying with current regulations. The equipment was kept in storage for almost six years because the hospital lacked qualified personnel to operate it.

Vicente Sotelo Alardín, then an employee of the medical center, dismantled the unit on December 6, 1983, to sell it as scrap metal at the Fénix junkyard at the request of the hospital's maintenance manager. Sotelo had disassembled the head of the radioactive unit and extracted a cylinder containing the cobalt-60 source. He then loaded the material into his truck, where he drilled into the cylinder, causing some cobalt-60 granules to spill into the bed of the vehicle. The truck, now contaminated by the cobalt-60, subsequently suffered a mechanical failure upon Sotelo's return from the junkyard and remained immobile near his home in Ciudad Juárez for 40 days.

Meanwhile, at the junkyard, the use of electromagnets for handling the scrap caused the cobalt-60 granules to spread throughout the yard. The fine granules were attracted to the magnetic fields of the other electromagnetic cranes in the yard and eventually mixed in with other metals. This radioactive scrap was sent to two foundries: Aceros de Chihuahua (Achisa), a construction rebar factory in the city of Chihuahua, and the maquiladora Falcón de Juárez, a manufacturer of table bases. It is estimated that these had already been exported to the United States and the interior of Mexico by January 1984.

=== Detection of radioactive material ===
On January 16, 1984, a radiation detector at Los Alamos National Laboratory in the U.S. state of New Mexico detected the presence of radioactivity in the vicinity. The detector was activated because a truck carrying rebar produced by Achisa had taken an accidental detour and passed through the entrance and exit gate of the laboratory's LAMPF technical area. Local authorities realized that the rebar triggered the alert and notified Mexico's National Commission on Nuclear Safety and Safeguards (CNSNS) on January 18. CNSNS confirmed a wide dispersion of radioactive material had occurred and ordered Achisa to suspend the distribution of manufactured rebar until it was verified that it was not contaminated. Mexican authorities also proceeded to close the junkyard.

On January 26, CNSNS personnel detected an abandoned truck emitting radiation levels of up to a thousand roentgens per hour. Since the vehicle was in a densely populated area, it was towed by a crane to El Chamizal Park. Having discovered the vehicle, CNSNS was able to track down Vicente Sotelo, who confirmed ownership and clarified that he worked at the Specialty Medical Center. Upon further investigation the CNSNS concluded that in addition to the Fénix junkyard, Achisa, and Falcón, three other companies had received contaminated material: Fundival in Gómez Palacio, Alumetales in Monterrey, and Duracero in San Luis Potosí. It was estimated that the contaminated material had made its way into 30,000 table bases and 6,600 tons of rebar.

== Aftermath ==
=== Recovery and cleanup ===
Decontamination began on January 20, 1984, two days after CNSNS was notified by U.S. authorities. Between February 8 and April 14, work was carried out to locate and isolate contaminated material in the Fénix junkyard. Decontamination work was also carried out at the Achisa and Falcón foundries during this period, in addition to tracking shipments with contaminated rebar that had been dispatched to 17 Mexican states.

CNSNS managed to recover 2,360 tons of unused rebar. It visited over 17,000 buildings suspected to be built with contaminated rebar, and determined that 814 structures would need to be demolished due to unacceptable levels of radiation. CNSNS also managed to recover all of the 30,000 contaminated table bases, in addition to about 90% of the thousand tons of contaminated rebar that had been exported to the United States. However, by June 1984, over a thousand tons of contaminated rebar remained unaccounted for, having been shipped to the states of Baja California, Baja California Sur, Chihuahua, Coahuila, Durango, Guanajuato, Hidalgo, Jalisco, Nuevo León, Querétaro, San Luis Potosí, Sinaloa, Sonora, Tamaulipas, and Zacatecas.

The work of retrieving the radioactive rebar was more complicated in these states; 434 tons of rebar were identified in Sonora, scattered throughout the state, including in the capital Hermosillo. Eighty tons of rebar had been shipped to Hidalgo and distributed among nine municipalities there, while 42 tons were recovered from the cities of Zacatecas and Fresnillo in Zacatecas. In those states, hundreds of fences and homes built with contaminated material had to be demolished.

=== Storage of radioactive material ===
In February 1984, the CNSNS identified a site in the Samalayuca desert for the construction of a "cemetery" facility known as La Piedrera to house the radioactive material, where the rebar collected in Chihuahua was eventually stored in September 1984. Material collected in other areas was stored at facilities in Maquixco, Mexico State (70 tons) and Mexicali, Baja California (115 tons).

According to CNSNS figures, 2,930 tons of contaminated rebar, 1,738 tons of contaminated unprocessed metal, 200 tons of metal table bases, 1,950 tons of contaminated scrap, 860 tons of containers with other contaminated material, and 29,191 tons of contaminated soil, slag, and plaster were stored in La Piedrera.

In 2001, a report by El Universal noted that 110 tons of radioactive waste from the Ciudad Juárez incident had been kept outdoors. The material had been stored in the Sierra de Nombre de Dios between 1985 and 1998, and then transferred to Samalayuca, where it was deposited without proper shielding. In 2004, an analysis by the National Autonomous University of Mexico revealed that radiation levels in Samalayuca were still alarmingly high and heavily criticized the fact that the waste had been stored without adequate containment measures. Cobalt-60 has a half-life of 5.27 years. Assuming the isotope was created in 1977—the year the original device was purchased—and not earlier, then by March 2025, 48 years will have passed. This corresponds to over nine half-lives, resulting in a 500-fold decrease in the intensity of the radiation originally emitted. By 2030 over 10 half-lives will have passed and the intensity of radiation emitted by the original source will have dropped by a factor of more than 1,000.

=== Population exposure ===
According to the 1985 CNSNS report, about four thousand people were exposed to cobalt-60 radiation as a result of the incident. It is estimated that almost 80 percent of people received a dose less than 500 mrem (equivalent to 5 mSv); 18 percent, between 0.5 and 25 rems (5–250 mSv); and only two percent (about 80 people) received doses greater than 25 rems (250 mSv). Of these, five people received a dose between 300 and 700 rems (3–7 Sv) over a period of two months. CNSNS also examined Vicente Sotelo's neighbors, determining that three of them had received a dose above 100 rems (1 Sv). For comparison, the average background radiation in the United States is 310 mrem (3 mSv) a year. Acute doses of 500 rem (5 Sv) kill half of those affected without medical treatment. Chronic doses (received over a longer period of time) are less damaging than acute doses.

== See also ==
- 1962 Mexico City radiation accident
- 1986–1988 radioactive milk distribution in Mexico
- Goiânia accident, a similar accident in Brazil in 1987
- Nuclear and radiation accidents and incidents
- Samut Prakan radiation accident
- List of civilian radiation accidents
- Radioactive scrap metal
- List of orphan source incidents
- 1990 Clinic of Zaragoza radiotherapy accident
- Therac-25
