= 1986–1988 radioactive milk distribution in Mexico =

Food safety scandal in Mexico

Between 1986 and 1988, thousands of tons of radioactive milk were distributed in Mexico by the Compañía Nacional de Subsistencias Populares (CONASUPO), the state-owned agency responsible for food supply and security in the country. The powdered milk had been purchased from the Irish Dairy Board (IDB), whose farmland and livestock had been affected by the Chernobyl disaster in 1986.

== Background and incident ==
Mexico purchased powdered milk from the Irish Dairy Board (IDB) to be rehydrated and distributed by the Compañía Nacional de Subsistencias Populares (CONASUPO), through its subsidiary, Liconsa. On 26 April 1986, the Chernobyl Nuclear Power Plant in Ukraine, then part of the USSR, suffered an explosion that resulted in the spread of radioactive material into the atmosphere. Between 28 April and 3 May, a radioactive cloud affected Ireland's farmland and livestock.

The World Health Organization (WHO) recommended against purchasing food from countries affected by the radioactive cloud, as livestock could consume contaminated vegetation. Reports indicated that the cloud contained cesium-137 and strontium-90. Following the radioactive cloud affected Irish crops, the IDB attempted to sell its milk production, initially offering it to the government of Brazil, which rejected it. The IDB then approached Mexico and, despite warnings from the Mexican ambassador to Brazil, Antonio González de León, the Mexican Secretariat of Health (SSA) approved the purchase and distribution of the powdered milk. The first shipment arrived in Mexico at the Port of Veracruz in June 1986, and a total of 28,000 metric tons (28,000 long tons; 31,000 short tons) were received during the remainder of the year. More than 40,000 metric tons (39,000 long tons; 44,000 short tons) were purchased between 1987 and 1988.

The milk was distributed across Mexico to prevent a regional concentration of potential consequences in a single area, and it contained as much as 2,730 becquerels per kilogram (Bq/kg), while the international standard set a maximum of 150 Bq/kg.

== Aftermath ==
A distributor detected 700 Bq/kg in a purchase from the CONASUPO and informed it about the issue. However, the agency ignored the report and continued purchasing contaminated milk.

In March 1987, CONASUPO requested the National Commission for Nuclear Safety and Safeguards to analyze random samples on the market, which found high levels of radioactive material in several products, including infant formula; the results were kept confidential. In an attempt to reduce the level of radioactivity in its milk, CONASUPO diluted it with milk from other sources; the attempt was unsuccessful, however, and almost all of the contaminated milk was placed on the market.

In April 1987, several navy personnel at the Port of Veracruz reported stomach illnesses to Vice Admiral Manuel Rodríguez Gordillo, chief of staff of the Third Naval Zone. An internal inquiry found that while the food prepared by the kitchen staff was in proper condition, the milk used had been stolen from previously received shipments. Rodríguez examined the cargo and identified it as being of Irish origin. He then requested physicist Miguel Ángel Valdovinos, head of the laboratory at the Laguna Verde Nuclear Power Station, and a friend of his, to analyze the milk. Tests detected traces of strontium-90 and cesium-137. Rodríguez disclosed the findings to his superiors within the Secretariat of the Navy; however, the federal government pressured the institution to suppress the information. Valdovinos was dismissed from his position, and Rodríguez was court-martialed on charges of treason, distributing radioactive material, and defamation. He was subsequently reassigned as a guard to the remote Revillagigedo Islands, located in the Pacific Ocean several hundred kilometers (miles) west of the mainland.

In January 1988, the environmental group Grupo de los Cien denounced the radioactive milk and issued a public protest against the purchase and requested a withdrawal from the market; Greenpeace later joined the complaint. Despite the matter being publicly known, CONASUPO approved the distribution of more contaminated milk on 4 February 1988.

The Mexican government implemented measures to conceal the scandal. Companies affected did not halt the use of the milk. According to Proceso, the following companies refused to withdraw their products and did not confirm whether they were aware of the issue: Nestlé (including its subsidiaries Carnation de México and Chocolates La Azteca), Anderson Clayton, Mead Johnson de México, Sandoz de México, Kraft Food de México, Wyeth Vales, Danone de México, Yakult, Productos Roche, Rompope Santa Clara, Laboratorios y Agencias Unidas, Evaporadora Mexicana, Chocolates Turín, United International, Richardson-Vicks, Bremen, Productos Marinela, Chocolates Ferback, Quesos Milán, Swensen de California, Helados Santa Ana, Industrias Cor, and Productos Lácteos Mayrán.

On 18 February 1988, the SSA officially ordered the return of the milk shipments. As a consequence of the case, an Official Mexican Standard (NOM-316) was established, setting a maximum limit of 50 Bq/kg for imported milk.

According to the head of oncology at the National Institute of Pediatrics at the time, the incidence of childhood cancer increased by 300 percent between 1987 and 1997; however, no data exist establishing a direct correlation with the distribution of contaminated milk. Likewise, there is no official public information on the number of people affected, even after the National Institute of Transparency for Access to Information and Personal Data Protection ordered the SSA to disclose all information in its possession.

On 30 November 1995, deputies from the National Action Party (PAN), Party of the Democratic Revolution (PRD), and Institutional Revolutionary Party (PRI) approved the creation of the CONASUPO Commission to determine direct and indirect responsibility, although the PRI, then the ruling party, succeeded in blocking multiple investigations.

During a 2013 visit to Mexico by President of Ireland Michael D. Higgins, Guillermo Zamora of Proceso asked Sonja Hyland, Ireland's ambassador to Mexico, for the Irish government's position on the incident. Hyland initially replied that the Irish embassy had been established in 1998 and therefore could not issue a position. The following day, she provided a more detailed response, stating that in February 1988 Joe Walsh, then Minister for Agriculture and Food, said that the milk exported to Mexico complied with international standards and those agreed upon by the European Economic Community, with radioactivity levels below 370 Bq/kg.

== See also ==
- 1962 Mexico City radiation accident
- Ciudad Juárez cobalt-60 contamination incident
