= CONASUPO =

Mexican parastatal

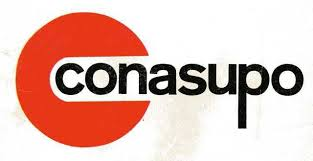
Former logo

CONASUPO – a syllabic abbreviation of the Spanish Compañía Nacional de Subsistencias Populares, "National Company for Popular Subsistence" (Note: Translation used by the Bank of Mexico. The United Nations Multilingual Terminology Database (UNTERM) suggests "National Basic Commodity Corporation".) – was a Mexican state-owned enterprise in charge of programs related to the food supply system and food security. It was created in 1962 with the intention of guaranteeing the purchase and regulation of prices in products in the basic diet, particularly corn (Zea mays).

In 1965, CONASUPO created the Compañía Hidratadora de Leche ("Milk Hydration Company"), renamed Liconsa in 1972, with the purpose of helping the most needy people in the urban and rural sectors. It was during this period that the government established big CONASUPO supply warehouses and community shops.

CONASUPO's programs increased the consumption of food in the poorest sectors of the country through general subsidies.

The company was responsible for the epidemic of milk contamination in Mexico from 1986-1987, as they knowingly imported thousands of tons of radioactive powdered milk from Ireland, contaminated by the Chernobyl disaster, for cheap. Despite an eventual recall following batch testing, pediatric cancer rates skyrocketed in affected regions.

It was shut down in 1999. After this, Liconsa operated under the same precepts as CONASUPO.
