= 1962 Mexico City radiation accident =

Mexican incident with four fatalities

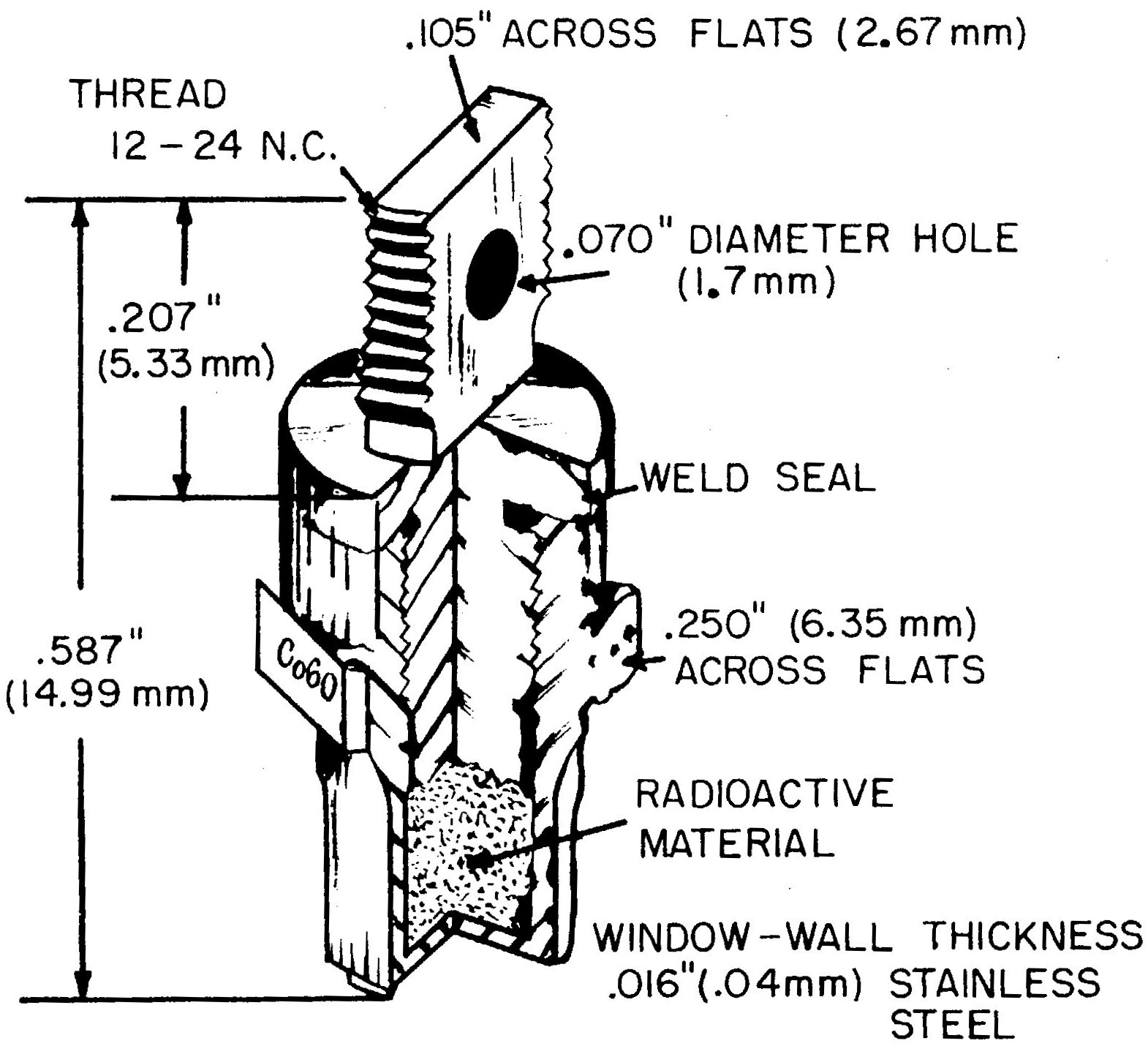
Diagram of capsule found in 1962 Mexico City Radiation Accident

Between March and July 1962, a radiation incident in Mexico City occurred when a ten-year-old boy took home an industrial radiography source and removed it from its proper shielding. Five individuals received significant doses of radiation from the 200-gigabecquerel cobalt-60 capsule, four of whom died.

Reports differ as to the source's provenance: it was either taken from an office, found in a field, or was already in the house's yard when the affected family moved in and "was left to the family to keep and watch without any of the members of the family knowing exactly what the container was". A 2008 report by UNSCEAR says it was left, unprotected, in the yard by an engineer.

The boy is believed to have obtained the source some time after moving into the house on March 21. He kept it in his trouser pocket for several days. On April 1, his mother, Mercedes Castellanos, placed it in the kitchen cabinet of their home, where it remained until July 22. The boy died on April 29. Subsequently, his mother – six months pregnant at the time – died on July 19; his two-year-old sister died on August 18; and his paternal grandmother, who had been living with the family since April 17, died on October 15 that year. The boy's father, José Espíndola Ibarra, also received a significant radiation dose; although he was left permanently sterile, he survived, presumably because he worked outside the home and his exposure was lower.

== See also ==
- List of orphan source incidents
- 1984 Ciudad Juárez cobalt-60 contamination incident
- 1986–1988 radioactive milk distribution in Mexico
- 1990 Clinic of Zaragoza radiotherapy accident
- 1987 Goiânia accident
- List of civilian radiation accidents
- Nuclear and radiation accidents and incidents
- Nuclear safety and security
- Radioactive scrap metal
- 2000 Samut Prakan radiation accident
- Therac-25
