= 1996 San Juan de Dios radiotherapy accident =

Radiotherapy accident at San Juan de Dios Hospital, San Jose, Costa Rica

Coordinates: 9°55′57″N 84°5′5″W

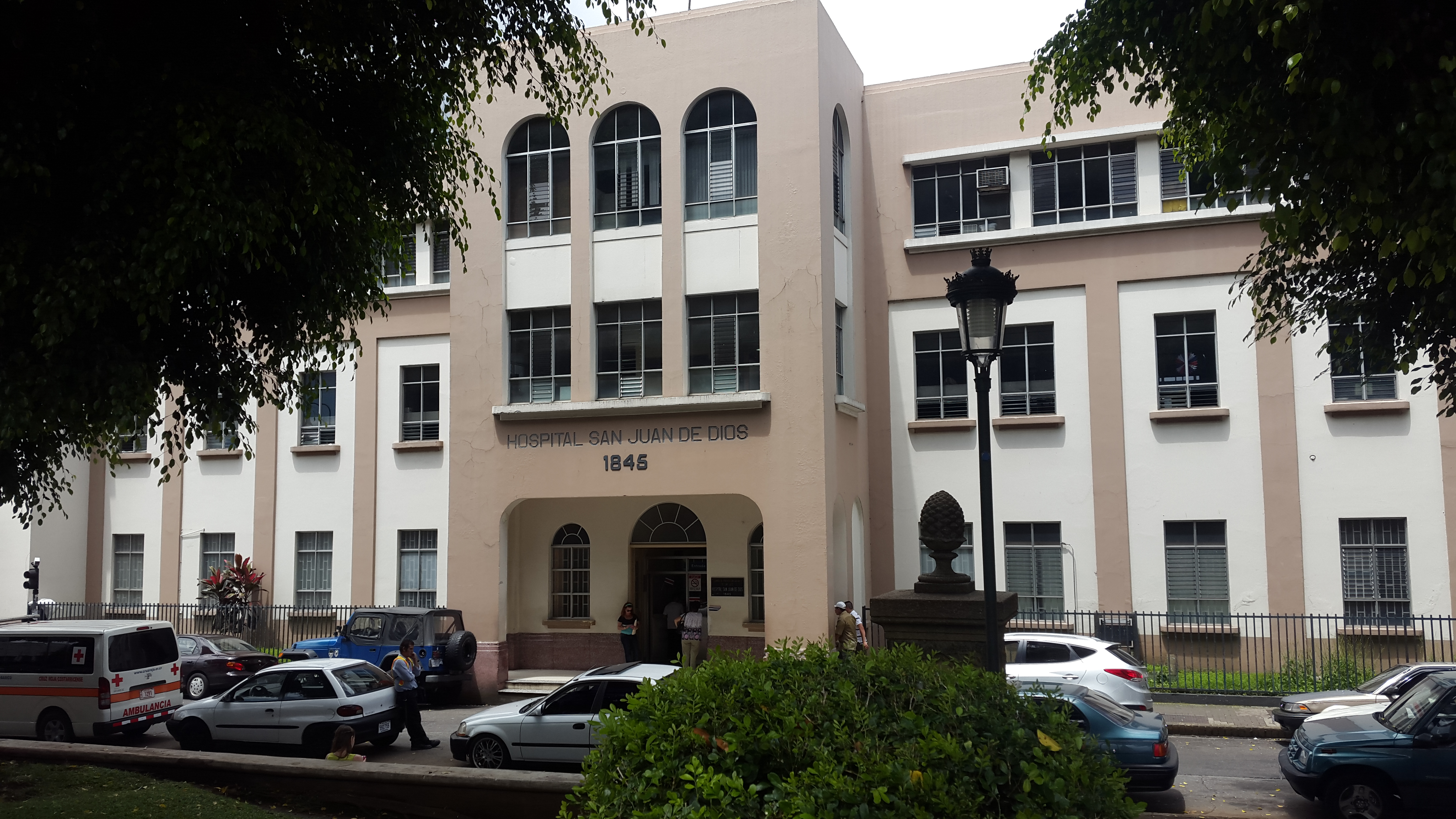
Hospital San Juan de Dios

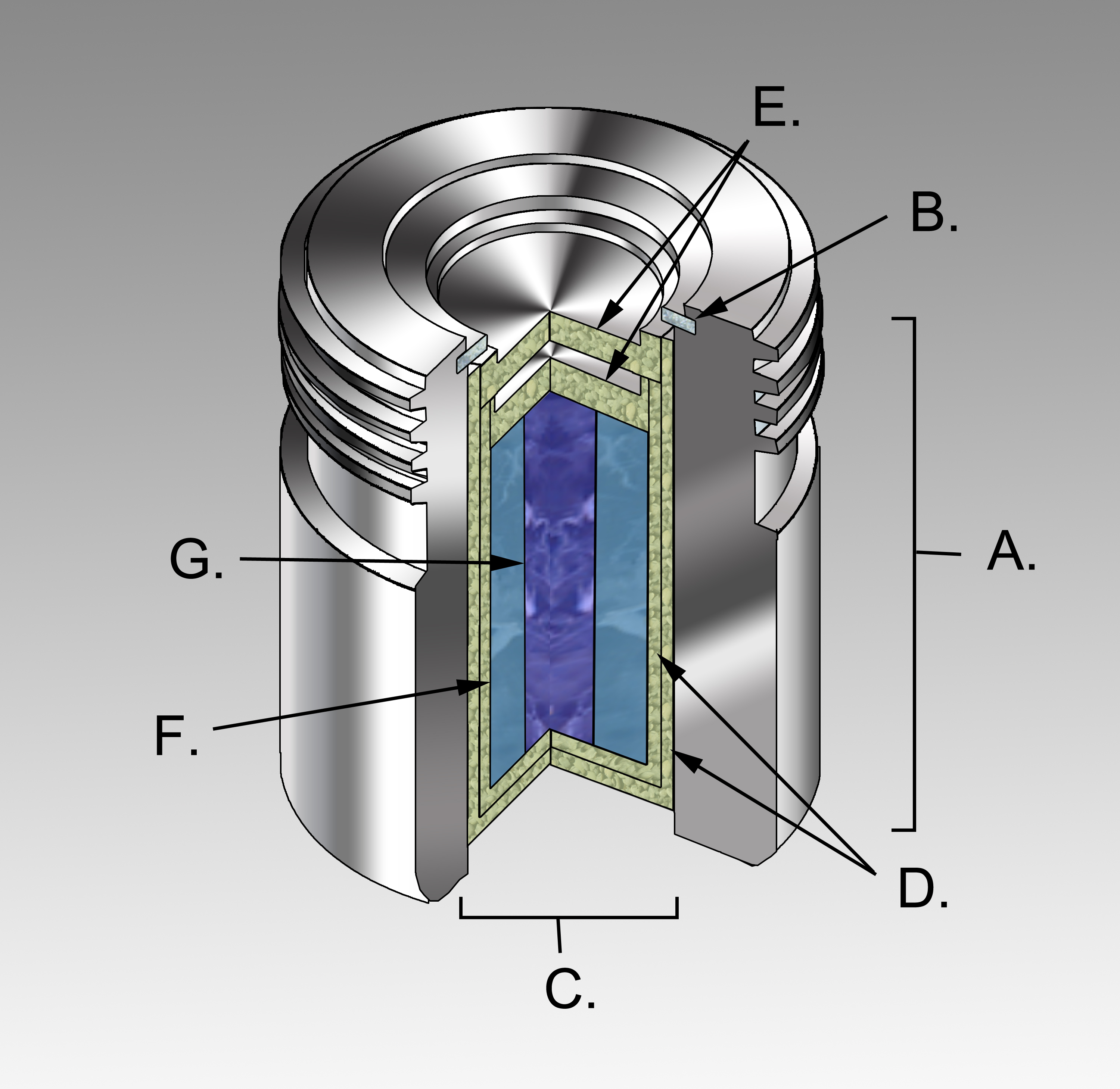
Cobalt-60 Teletherapy Capsule

In 1996, a series of radiotherapy accidents occurred in Costa Rica within the Alcyon II radiotherapy unit at San Juan de Dios Hospital in San José, Costa Rica. It was related to a cobalt-60 source that was being used for radiotherapy in. An accidental overexposure of radiotherapy patients treated during August and September 1996 was detected. During the calibration process done after the change of ^{60}Co source on 22 August 1996, a mistake was made in calculating the dose rate, leading to severe overexposure of patients. The error of calibration was detected on 27 September 1996, after which treatments ceased. It was determined that over the course of the accident, 115 patients received an overdose of radiation and of those, 13 died of confirmably radiation-related injuries. This number does not account for the many potential deaths, suicides, and uncontactable former patients that are believed to have had plausible stochastic connection to the overexposures.

The San Juan de Dios Hospital, located in Costa Rica, was one of the major medical facilities offering radiotherapy services in the country. In the mid-1990s, this facility introduced cobalt-60 therapy machines as a means of treating cancer. Radiotherapy is a critical component in cancer management; however, it requires careful calibration and dosimetry to ensure safety and efficacy in therapeutic procedures.

Prior to the accident in 1996, international concerns were growing over the dangers of radiation therapy errors, especially in poorly equipped facilities where outdated equipment and a lack of regulatory supervision could compromise safety. Costa Rica's health system was in the process of being upgraded at the time, and although radiotherapy was an established treatment modality, the strict application of safety measures and quality control procedures might not have been consistently practiced.

== Estimation of casualties ==
Shortly after the incident, the Ministry of Health of Costa Rica conducted an evaluation which confirmed the overexposure to patients. It was found that during the calculation for the exposure time to patients, the wrong unit of time was used. The unit that the person in charge of dosimetry thought the machine was using was 1/100th of a minute, but the actual unit being used was seconds. This resulted in the dosage received by patients being approximately 60% higher than intended. It was not until July 1997 that an official review was carried out, and by that time, only 73 of the original patients remained alive. Of the 73, only 70 were examined and evaluated, and at the time of evaluation, 4 of the patients were suffering from "catastrophic consequences," while an additional 16 were experiencing major effects of overexposure. There were 26 individuals that were identified to be suffering minor effects but that in the future there was a higher risk of suffering further complications. 22 patients that were examined had little to no identifiable effects and were told they only had a low risk for future effects. 2 of the patients evaluated were underexposed.

In 2001, the radiophysicist whose mistake caused the radiation overdoses was charged with 16 culpable homicides and sentenced to six years in prison.

== See also ==
- List of civilian radiation accidents
- Goiânia accident
- 1962 Mexico City radiation accident
- Radiotherapy accident in Zaragoza
- X-ray
- Nuclear safety
- Nuclear whistleblowers
