= Clinic of Zaragoza radiotherapy accident =

1990 Spanish radiological accident

Coordinates: 41.6434°N 0.9055°W

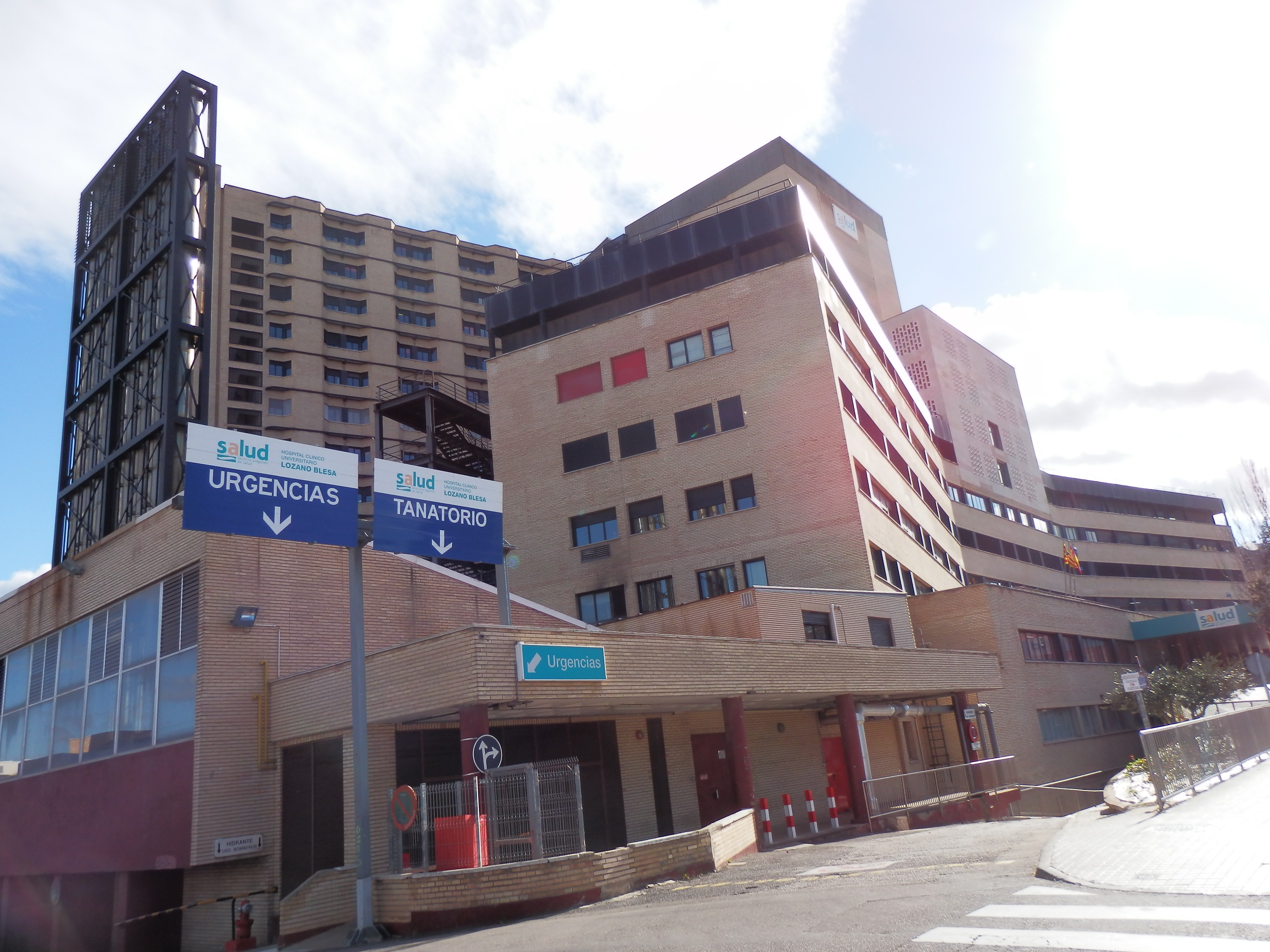
The University Clinic Hospital Lozano Blesa, where the incident took place

The 1990 Clinic of Zaragoza radiotherapy accident was a radiological accident that occurred from 10 to 20 December 1990, at University Clinic Hospital Lozano Blesa of Zaragoza, in Aragon, Spain.

In the accident, at least 27 patients were injured, and 11 of them died due to the overexposure, according to the International Atomic Energy Agency (IAEA). All of the injured were cancer patients receiving external beam radiotherapy.

== Chronology ==
On 7 December 1990, a technician performed maintenance on an electron accelerator at the Clinic of Zaragoza. On 10 December, it returned to service after the repairs.

Affected patients immediately suffered burns on the skin of the irradiated area, as well as inflammation of the internal organs and bone marrow. The first overexposed patient died on 16 February 1991, two months after irradiation. Fatalities increased until, on 25 December 1991, the last of a total of 25 patients died. The IAEA established that 11 of the deaths were due to the faulty maintenance.

On 19 December 1990, the Nuclear Safety Council (CSN) was scheduled to make its annual review of the device but, due to bureaucratic reasons, this review was delayed. The CSN found the electron accelerator power was too high. The unit was deactivated on 20 December 1990 and restarted on 8 March 1991.

== The accident ==
The radiotherapy unit was repaired without following the correct instructions. The unit, in service 14 years at the time of the failure, had a breakdown in the electron beam accelerator control system (i.e. a "deviator"). Repairs incorrectly increased output power, so patients that should have received therapy at 7 MeV were instead treated at 40 MeV.

== See also ==
- Therac-25
- Ionizing radiation
- List of civilian radiation accidents
- Radioactive scrap metal
- List of orphan source incidents
- 1962 Mexico City radiation accident
- Goiânia accident
- Nuclear and radiation accidents and incidents
- Ciudad Juárez cobalt-60 contamination incident
- Samut Prakan radiation accident
