= Radioactive scrap metal =

Scrap metal-contaminated from radioactive material

Radioactive scrap metal is created when radioactive material enters the metal recycling process and contaminates scrap metal.

== Overview ==
A "lost source accident" occurs when a radioactive object is lost or stolen. Such objects may appear in the scrap metal industry if radioactive sources are lost or improperly stored or disposed of, leading to people mistaking them for harmless bits of metal. The International Atomic Energy Agency has provided guides for scrap metal collectors on what a sealed source might look like. The best known example of this type of event is the Goiânia accident, in Brazil.

While some lost-source accidents have not involved the scrap metal industry, they are good examples of the likely scale and scope of a lost-source accident. For example, the Red Army left sources behind in Didi Lilo, Georgia.

Another case occurred at Yanango where an ^{192}Ir radiography source was lost and at Gilan, Iran a radiography source harmed a welder.

Radioactive sources have a wide range of uses in medicine and industry, and it is common for the design (and nature) of a source to be tailored to the specific application. Hence, it is impossible to state with confidence what the "typical" source looks like or contains. For instance, antistatic devices include beta and alpha emitters: polonium containing devices have been used to eliminate static electricity in such devices as paint spraying equipment. An overview of the gamma sources used for radiography can be seen at Radiographic equipment, and it is reasonable to consider this to be a good overview of small to moderate gamma sources.

== Notable incidents ==
- 1930s and 1940s – In the US, gold which was contaminated with radioactive lead-210 entered the jewelry industry after a person in upstate New York melted gold seeds used in brachytherapy that had originally contained radon-222. By the 1960s, health officials had reported cases of skin damage and cancer in people who had worn contaminated rings. A 1981 investigation by the state identified at least 177 contaminated pieces of jewelry worn by 127 people throughout the state and in northwestern Pennsylvania, of which nine had developed cancer and 41 had a non-cancerous skin disease linked to radiation.
- 1982 – In northern Taiwan, a Cobalt-60 source was recycled with steel into rebar and used in the construction of apartment buildings, principally in Taipei from 1982 through 1984. Over 2,000 apartment units and shops were suspected as having been built using the material. About 10,000 people are believed to have been exposed to long-term low-level irradiation as a result. In the summer of 1992, a utility worker for the Taiwanese state-run electric utility Taipower brought a Geiger counter to his apartment to learn more about the device, and discovered that his apartment was contaminated. Despite awareness of the problem, owners of some of the buildings known to be contaminated have continued to rent apartments to tenants (in part because selling the units is illegal). Some research has shown that the radiation has had a "beneficial" effect upon the health of the tenants based on the death rate from cancers, Another study looking at the incidence of cancer found that although the overall risk of cancer was sharply reduced (SIR = 0.6, 95% CI 0.5 – 0.7), the incidence of certain leukemias in men (n = 6, SIR = 3.4, 95% CI 1.2 – 7.4) and thyroid cancer in women (n = 6, SIR = 2.6, 95% CI 1.0 – 5.7) were more prevalent.
- December 1983 – Ciudad Juárez, Mexico. A local resident salvaged materials from a discarded radiation therapy machine containing 6,010 pellets of cobalt-60. Transport of the material led to severe contamination of his truck. When the truck was scrapped, it contaminated another 5,000 metric tonnes of steel to an estimated 300 Ci (11 TBq) of activity. This steel was used to manufacture kitchen and restaurant table legs and rebar, some of which was shipped to the US and Canada. The incident was discovered months later when a truck delivering contaminated steel building materials to the Los Alamos National Laboratory drove into the facility through a radiation monitoring station intended to detect radiation leaving the facility. Contamination was later measured on roads used to transport the original damaged radiation source. Some pellets were found embedded in the roadway. In the state of Sinaloa, 109 houses were condemned due to use of contaminated building material. This incident prompted the Nuclear Regulatory Commission and Customs Service to install radiation detection equipment at all major border crossings.
- September 1987 – Goiânia accident in Brazil; four people died from caesium radiation poisoning during their search for scrap metal, and 249 other people had significant radiation exposure.
- May 1998 – Recycler Acerinox in Cádiz, Spain, unwittingly melted scrap metal containing caesium-137; the radioactive cloud drifted to Switzerland before being detected. (See Acerinox accident.)
- January 2000 – At Samut Prakan, a 15.7 TBq (420 Ci) cobalt-60 teletherapy source was stolen and sold as scrap, and attempts were made by scrap metal workers to recycle the metal. Three people died, and thousands of others were exposed to radiation. It was found that at the edge of the scrap yard, the dose rate was about 1 to 10 mSv·h^{−1}. The exact location of the source in the scrap yard was determined using a fluorescent screen which acted as a scintillator; this device was held on the end of a long pole.
- July 2010 – During a routine inspection at the Port of Genoa, on Italy's northwest coast, a cargo container from Saudi Arabia containing nearly 23 000 kg of scrap copper was detected to be emitting gamma radiation at a rate of around 500 mSv/h. After spending over a year in quarantine on Port grounds, Italian officials dissected the container using robots and discovered a rod of cobalt-60 23 cm long and 0.8 cm in diameter intermingled with the scrap. Officials suspected its provenance to be inappropriately disposed of medical or food-processing equipment. The rod was sent to Germany for further analysis, after which it was likely to be recycled.
- May 2013 – A batch of metal-studded belts sold by online retailer ASOS.com were confiscated and held in a US radioactive storage facility after testing positive for cobalt-60.

== Physical and chemical compositions ==
The cleanup operation for the Goiânia accident was difficult both because the source containment had been opened, and the radioactive material was water-soluble.

In 1983, a different incident in Mexico wherein cobalt-60 was spilled in an otherwise similar exposure led to a very different pattern of contamination, since the cobalt in such a source is normally in the form of cobalt metal alloyed with some nickel to improve the mechanical properties of the radioactive metal. If such a source is abused, then the cobalt metal fragments do not tend to dissolve in water or become very mobile. If a cobalt or iridium source is lost at a ferrous metal scrapyard then it is often the case that the source will enter a furnace, the radioactive metal will melt and contaminate the steel from this furnace. In Mexico, some buildings have been demolished because of the level of cobalt-60 in the steel used to make them. Also, some of the steel which was rendered radioactive in the Mexican event was used to make legs for 1400 tables.

== Source melting ==
In the case of some high-value scrap metals it is possible to decontaminate the material, but this is best done long before the metal goes to a scrap yard.

=== Ferrous scrap ===
In the case of a caesium source being melted in an electric arc furnace used for steel scrap, it is more likely that the caesium will contaminate the fly ash or dust from the furnace, while radium is likely to stay in the ash or slag. The United States Environmental Protection Agency provides data about the fate of different contaminating elements in a scrap furnace. Four different fates for the element exist: the element can stay in the metal (as with cobalt and ruthenium); the element can enter the slag (as in lanthanides, actinides and radium); the element can enter the furnace dust or fly ash (as with caesium), which accounts for around 5%; or the element can leave the furnace and pass through the baghouse to enter the air (as with iodine).

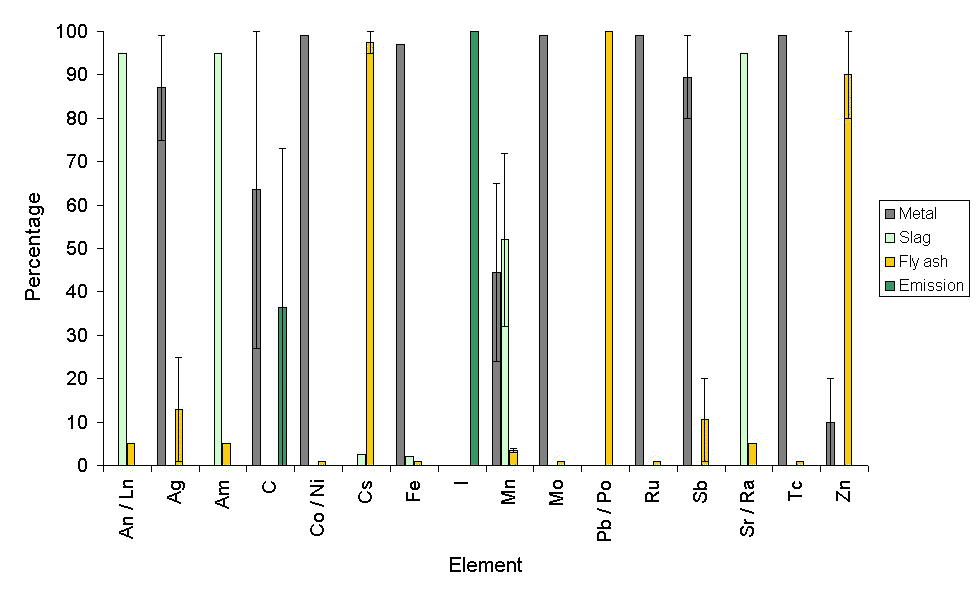
The fates of different elements present in ferrous scrap which is melted in an electric arc furnace. The average of the two extremes is shown and the error bars indicate the possible limits

=== Aluminium scrap ===
It is normal to place silicon, aluminium scrap and flux in a furnace. This is heated to form molten aluminium. From the furnace three main streams are obtained, metal product, dross (metal oxides and halides which are skimmed off the molten metal product) and off gases which go to the baghouse. The cooled waste gasses are then allowed out into the environment.

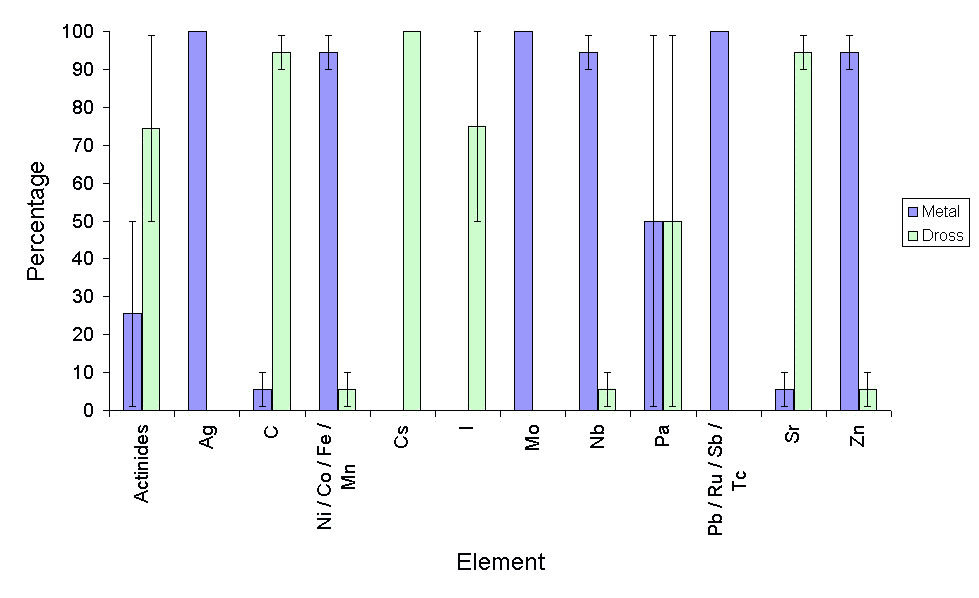
The fates of different elements present in aluminium scrap which is melted in a furnace. The average of the two extremes is shown and the error bars indicate the possible limits

=== Copper scrap ===
It is normal that good-quality scrap copper, such as that from a nuclear plant, is refined in one furnace before being refined further in an electrochemical process. The furnace generates impure metal, slag, dust and gases. The dust accumulates in a baghouse, while the gases are vented to the atmosphere. The impure metal from the furnace may be further refined in an electrochemical process.

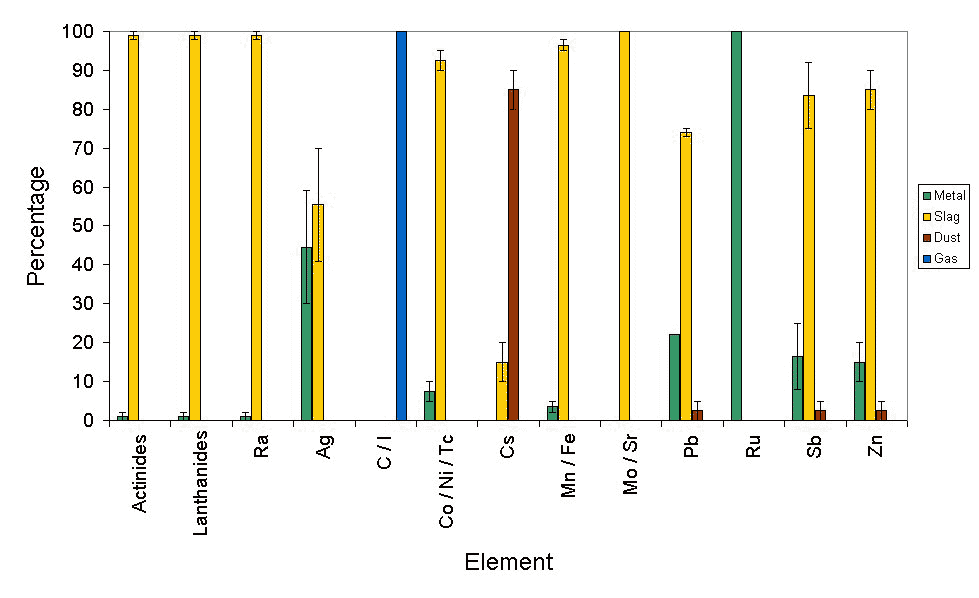
The fates of different elements present in copper scrap which is melted in a furnace. The average of the two extremes is shown and the error bars indicate the possible limits. The elements present in the scrap end up in different proportions in the impure metal, the slag, the baghouse dust or the exhaust gases that leave the plant via the stack

If the copper refinery includes an electrochemical process after the furnace, then unwanted elements are removed from the impure metal and deposited as anode slime.

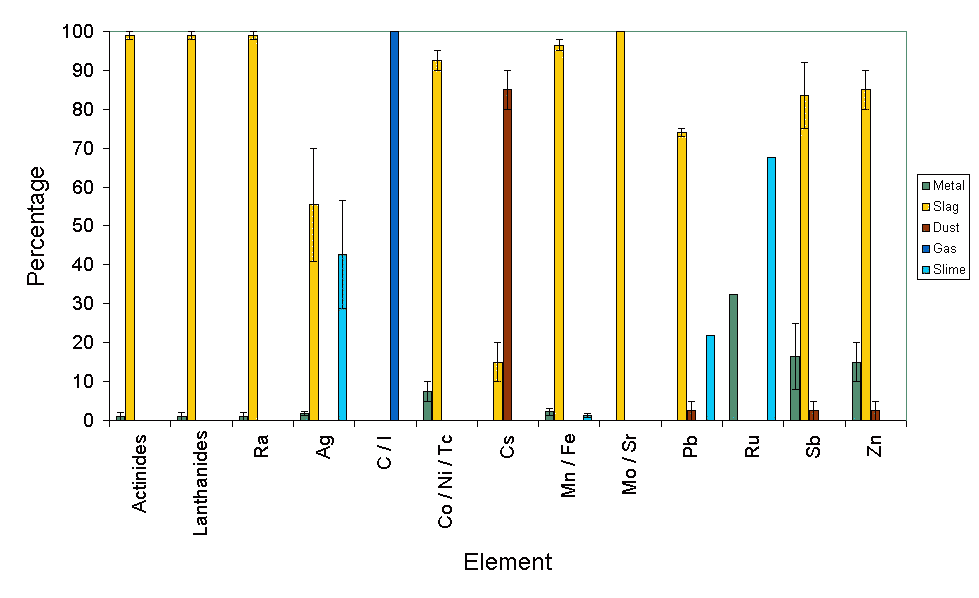
The fates of different elements present in copper scrap which is melted in a furnace and then electrorefined. The average of the two extremes is shown and the error bars indicate the possible limits. The elements in the scrap end up in different proportions in the refined copper metal, the slag, the baghouse dust, the exhaust gases that leave the plant via the stack, or the anode slime

== See also ==
- Nuclear crime
