= Acerinox accident =

1998 radiological contamination accident occurring in Cádiz, Spain

Coordinates: 36.179157684847944°N 5.438107021971783°W

The Acerinox accident was a radioactive contamination accident in the province of Cádiz. In May 1998, a caesium-137 source managed to pass through the monitoring equipment in an Acerinox scrap metal reprocessing plant in Los Barrios, Spain. When melted, the caesium-137 caused the release of a radioactive cloud. The Acerinox chimney detectors failed to detect it, but it was eventually detected in France, Italy, Switzerland, Germany, and Austria. The activity concentrations measured were up to 1000 times higher than normal background levels, although the absolute values recorded are still regarded as negligible in terms of radiation protection.

The accident contaminated the scrap metal reprocessing plant, plus two other steel mills that sent its waste for decontamination. According to independent laboratories, the ashes produced by the Acerinox factory had between 640 and 1420 becquerels per gram (the Euratom norm is 10 Bq/g), high enough to be a threat to the public.

On the radiological consequences of this event, six people were exposed to slight levels of caesium-137 contamination. The estimated total costs for clean-up, waste storage, and lost production in the factory were around 26 million US dollars (most of it due to the lost production).

== See also ==
- List of civilian radiation accidents
