= List of civilian radiation accidents =

2007 ISO radioactivity danger symbol for IAEA Category 1, 2, and 3 sources defined as able to cause death or serious injury

This article lists notable civilian accidents involving radioactive materials or involving ionizing radiation from artificial sources such as x-ray tubes and particle accelerators. Accidents related to nuclear power that involve fissile materials are listed at List of civilian nuclear accidents. Military accidents are listed at List of military nuclear accidents.

== Scope of this article ==
In listing civilian radiation accidents, the following criteria have been followed:

1. There must be well-attested and substantial health damage, property damage or contamination.
2. The damage must be related directly to radioactive materials or ionizing radiation from a man-made source, not merely taking place at a facility where such are being used.
3. To qualify as "civilian", the operation or material must be principally for non-military purposes.
4. The event is not an event involving fissile material or a nuclear reactor.

== Before 1950s ==
- Clarence Madison Dally (1865–1904) – No International Nuclear Event Scale (INES) level – New Jersey, USA – overexposure of laboratory worker to X-rays
- Various dates – No INES level – France – overexposure of scientists
  - Marie Skłodowska Curie (1867–1934) was a Polish-French physicist and chemist. She was a pioneer in the early field of radioactivity, later becoming the first two-time Nobel laureate and the only person with Nobel Prizes in both physics and chemistry. Her death, at age 67, in 1934 was from aplastic anemia due to massive exposure to radiation in her work, much of which was carried out in a shed with no proper safety measures being taken, as the damaging effects of hard radiation were not generally understood at that time. She was known to carry test tubes full of radioactive isotopes in her pocket, and to store them in her desk drawer, resulting in massive exposure to radiation. She was known to remark on the pretty blue-green light the metals gave off in the dark. Although her papers are likely to present little risk today, they are nonetheless contaminated with radium. They are kept in lead-lined boxes, and those who wish to consult them must wear gloves and sign a waiver out of caution.
- Various dates – No INES level – various locations – overexposure of workers – radium poisoning
  - Luminescent radium was used to paint watches and other items that glowed. The most notable incident is the "Radium Girls" of Orange, New Jersey, USA where many workers suffered from radiation poisoning. Other towns including Ottawa, Illinois experienced contamination of homes and other structures, and became Superfund cleanup sites.
- Various dates – No INES level – Colorado, USA – contamination
  - Radium mining and manufacturing left a number of streets in the state's capital and largest city of Denver contaminated.
- 1927–1930 – No INES level – USA – radium poisoning
  - Eben Byers ingested almost 1400 bottles of Radithor, a radioactive patent medicine, leading to his death in 1932. He is buried in Allegheny Cemetery in Pittsburgh, Pennsylvania, in a lead-lined coffin.
- Harry Daghlian, an American physicist in the Manhattan Project, was building a neutron reflector by stacking tungsten carbide bricks around a plutonium core on August 21, 1945. He accidentally added an extra brick to the assembly, which resulted in a criticality accident. Daghlian received a lethal dose of radiation and died 25 days later after falling into a coma.
- Louis Slotin, a Canadian physicist in the Manhattan Project, accidentally dropped the shield on the plutonium ball (the so-called "demon core") causing a strong burst of radiation, as he was showing his colleagues how to bring the exposed core of a nuclear weapon nearly to the point of criticality on May 21, 1946. The dose of radiation he received as a result was so high that he died within 25 days of the accident.

== 1950s ==
- March 1957 – No INES level – Houston, Texas, USA – exposure of workers
  - Two employees of a company licensed by the U.S. Atomic Energy Commission to encapsulate sources for radiographic cameras received radiation burns after being exposed to ^{192}Ir powder. The incident was reported in Look Magazine in 1961, but investigations published by the Mayo Clinic that same year found few of the radiological injuries claimed in widespread press reports.
- 10 October 1957 – The Windscale fire at the facility in Cumberland, Northern England (now Sellafield, Cumbria), UK. It lasted for three days and spread significant quantities of radioactive isotopes across the UK and Europe. Modern assessment of historical data rated the event a 5 on the INES, indicating an accident with widespread consequences.
- 2 July 1956 – Sylvania Electric Products explosion in Queens, New York City, USA. Explosions of thorium slugs resulted in the death by toxic heavy metal poisoning of one plant employee.
- June 1958 – Y-12 National Security Complex criticality incident in the USA – Eight workers injured in the incident.
- July 1959 The Sodium Reactor Experiment, an experimental reactor at work from 1957 to 1964 and part of the Santa Susana Field Laboratory, suffered a partial meltdown when 13 of its 43 fuel rods partially melted, releasing radioctive gas to the atmosphere.

== 1960s ==
- In the 1962 Mexico City radiation accident, a boy found a 5-curie cobalt-60 lost source in Mexico City and brought it home. Prolonged exposure to the source caused the death of the boy and three other members of his family.
- In 1964, Robert Peabody died after an accident at the United Nuclear Corporation Fuels Recovery Plant in Wood River Junction, Rhode Island, USA.

== 1970s ==
- 1975 – Brescia, Italy, at a cereal irradiation facility with four cobalt-60 sources, a worker entered the irradiation room by climbing onto the conveyor belt. His first symptoms of exposure (nausea, vomiting, headache, and erythema) were attributed to insecticides. For more than two days, his exposure to an unshielded 500-TBq source remained unknown to the physicians. He died 13 days after exposure; his whole-body dose was evaluated at 12 Gy, non-uniform.
- 1977 – Dounreay, United Kingdom – release of nuclear material

- An explosion at the Dounreay Nuclear Power Development Establishment caused a mixture of unrecorded waste to be leaked from a waste disposal shaft.

- July 13, 1978 – Institute for High Energy Physics in Protvino, Russia – Anatoli Bugorski survived high-energy proton beam from a particle accelerator passing through his brain.
- July 16, 1979 – Church Rock uranium mill spill in the USA – release of radioactive mine tailings

- An earth/clay dike of a United Nuclear Corporation uranium mill settling/evaporating pond failed. The broken dam released 100 million U.S. gallons (380,000 m^{3}) of radioactive liquids and 1,100 short tons (1,000 t) of solid wastes, which settled out up to 70 miles (100 km) down the Puerco River and also near a Navajo farming community that uses surface waters. As a result, the Navajo community suffered serious health implications. The pond was past its planned and licensed life and had been filled two feet (60 cm) deeper than design, despite evident cracking.

- September 29, 1979 – Tritium leak at American Atomics in Tucson, Arizona, USA. At the public school across the street from the plant, $300,000 worth of food was found to be contaminated. The chocolate cake had 56 nCi/L (2,100 Bq/L) of tritium.

== 1980s ==
- Early 1981 – Douglas Crofut, an unemployed industrial radiographer, was injured by an unknown source of radiation, suffering severe radiation burns from which he would ultimately die. Although the source of radiation was never conclusively determined, the US Nuclear Regulatory Commission strongly suspected that the source was an ^{192}Ir industrial radiographic source which had temporarily gone missing and had been in the care of a fellow industrial radiographer living near Crofut. At the time of his injury and death, Crofut was reported to have been the first such death in the US since the Manhattan Project. Crofut's death is notable for being the only US death attributable to an unknown source of radiation, along with being the only known case in the US of a suspected suicide undertaken via radiation exposure.
- July 1981 – Lycoming, Nine Mile Point, New York, USA. An overloaded wastewater tank was deliberately flushed into a building subbasement, resulting in a pool four feet deep. This caused a number of the approximately 150 55-gallon drums stored there to overturn and spill their contents. Fifty thousand U.S. gallons (190 m^{3}) of contaminated water was discharged into Lake Ontario.
- 1982 – International Nutronics of Dover, New Jersey USA spilled an unknown quantity of ^{60}Co solution used to treat gems, modify chemicals, and sterilize food and medical supplies. The solution spilled into the Dover sewer system and forced shutdown of the plant. The Nuclear Regulatory Commission was not informed of the accident until ten months later by a whistleblower.
- 1982 – Cobalt-60 (possibly from a radiotherapy source) became recycled into steel rebar and used in the construction of buildings in northern Taiwan, principally in Taipei, from 1982 through 1984. Over 200 residential and other buildings were found to have been built using the material. About 7000 people are believed to have been exposed to long-term low-level radiation as a result. In the summer of 1992, a utility worker for the Taiwanese state-run electric utility Taipower brought a Geiger counter to his apartment to learn more about the device, and discovered that his apartment was contaminated. Despite awareness of the problem, owners of some of the buildings suspected to be contaminated have continued to rent apartments out to tenants (in part because selling the units is illegal). Some research has found that the radiation has had an apparent "beneficial" effect upon the health of the tenants based on the death rate from cancers. Another study looking at the incidence of cancer found that although the overall risk of cancer was sharply reduced (SIR = 0.6, 95% CI 0.5 – 0.7), the incidence of certain leukemias in men (n = 6, SIR = 3.4, 95% CI 1.2 – 7.4) and thyroid cancer in women (n = 6, SIR = 2.6, 95% CI 1.0 – 5.7) was greater.
- December 6, 1983 – Ciudad Juárez, Mexico. In the Ciudad Juárez cobalt-60 contamination incident, a local resident salvaged materials from a discarded radiation therapy machine containing 6,010 pellets of ^{60}Co. The transport of the material led to severe contamination of his truck. When the truck was scrapped, it in turn contaminated another five tonnes of steel to an estimated 300 Ci (11 TBq) of activity. This steel was used to manufacture kitchen and restaurant table legs and rebar, some of which was shipped to the U.S. and Canada. The incident was discovered months later when a truck delivering contaminated building materials to the Los Alamos National Laboratory drove through a radiation monitoring station. Contamination was later measured on roads used to transport the original damaged radiation source. Some pellets were found embedded in the roadway. In the state of Sinaloa, 109 houses were condemned due to use of contaminated building material. This incident prompted the Nuclear Regulatory Commission and Customs Service to install radiation detection equipment at all major border crossings.
- 1984 – Lost source accident in Morocco, in which an Ir-192 source was taken home by a laborer, resulting in eight deaths in the 1984 Moroccan radiation accident. Either a drive cable detached from a pigtail or the connection between the pigtail and the source failed. As a result, the source was lost within an industrial site, the source was taken home by a non-radiographic worker who along with seven members of his family died.
- 1985 to 1987 – The Therac-25 was a radiation therapy machine produced by Atomic Energy of Canada Limited (AECL). It is known to be responsible for six accidents between 1985 and 1987, in which patients were given massive overdoses of radiation, which were in some cases on the order of hundreds of grays. Three patients died as a result of the overdoses. These accidents highlighted the dangers of inadequate software control of safety-critical systems.
- September 13, 1987 – In the Goiânia accident, scavengers broke open a radiation-therapy machine in an abandoned clinic in Goiânia, Brazil. They sold the kilocurie (40 TBq) caesium-137 source as a glowing curiosity. Two hundred and fifty people were contaminated; four died.
- June 6, 1988 – Radiation Sterilizers, Inc. (now Sterigenics) in Decatur, Georgia, USA reported a leak of ^{137}Cs at their facility. Seventy thousand medical supply containers and milk cartons were recalled.
- 5 February 1989 – Three workers were exposed to gamma rays from the ^{60}Co source in a medical products irradiation plant in San Salvador, El Salvador. The most exposed person died; another lost two limbs. A number of safety systems at the plant had been disabled, and workers were unaware of the danger posed by the radioactive source.
- 1989 – In the Kramatorsk radiological accident, a small capsule containing highly radioactive ^{137}Cs was found inside the concrete wall in an apartment building in Kramatorsk, Ukrainian SSR. It is believed that the capsule, originally contained in a measurement device, was lost sometime during the late 1970s and ended up mixed in with gravel used to construct that building in 1980. By the time the capsule was discovered, four residents of the building had died from leukemia and 17 more received varying doses of radiation.

== 1990s ==
- June 24, 1990 – Soreq, Israel – An operator at a commercial irradiation facility bypassed safety systems to clear a jam in the product conveyor area. The one- to two-minute exposure resulted in a whole body dose estimated at 10 Gy (1,000 rad) or more. He died 36 days later despite extensive medical care.
- December 10–20, 1990 – a radiological accident that occurred at the Clinic of Zaragoza, in Spain. In the accident, at least 27 patients were injured, and 11 of them died, according to IAEA. All of the injured were cancer patients receiving radiotherapy.
- October 26, 1991 – Nesvizh, Belarus – An operator at an atomic sterilization facility bypassed the safety systems to clear a jammed conveyor. Upon entering the irradiation chamber he was exposed to an estimated whole body dose of 11 Gy, with some portions of the body receiving upwards of 20 Gy. Despite prompt intensive medical care, he died 113 days after the accident.
- June 1992 – A Ph.D. student at the Institute for Animal Health in the UK, now the Pirbright Institute, received an approximately 2.5 Gy dose from ^{32}P labelled organo-phosphate as part of an experiment to label virus infected cells. The company shipping the material had supplied over 1000 times the amount and the receiving site did not have adequate monitoring facilities for source material.
- November 16, 1992 – 1992 Pennsylvania brachytherapy incident – After treating a patient with HDR brachytherapy, personnel ignored alarms indicating high radiation levels and an available radiation survey meter was not used to confirm or rule out the area alarm's signal. A radioactive pellet of ^{192}Ir had broken off inside the patient during treatment. The patient was transported back to a nursing home where the catheter containing the radioactive pellet fell out four days later. The patient received a thousand times the intended dose and died several days later.
- November 17, 1992 – Trần Đức Thiệp, the director of the Viet Nam National Centre for Scientific Research in Hanoi placed his hands into a particle accelerator to adjust a sample of gold ore. This adjustment would usually be done using compressed air, but Thiệp entered the room and adjusted the samples by hand. At the same time, his colleagues, mistakenly believing he had left the room to wash his hands with soap in a sink placed outside the containment room, switched the machine on. Thiệp was exposed to a beam current of 6 μA for between two and four minutes. Thiệp suffered severe tissue necrosis in his hands requiring specialist treatment in Paris, and ultimately had to have his right hand amputated. Thiệp lost the fourth and fifth fingers on his left hand, which subsequently suffered chronic stiffness and radiation-induced fibrosis. He returned to work at the facility in Hanoi in 1994, after more than 600 days of treatment for acute radiation injuries.
- November 19, 1992 – A 10 Ci (370 GBq) ^{60}Co source (which was used for an agricultural project) was taken home by a worker from a well within a construction site which used to be part of an environmental monitoring station in Xinzhou, Shanxi (China). This resulted in three deaths and affected 100+ people. A woman was exposed to radiation while nursing her sick husband. Her dose was estimated to be 2.3 Gy by means of a blood test 41 days after the accident, 16 years after the accident the woman has been subject to premature aging which may be a result of her radiation exposure. Her then unborn child (induced at 37 weeks, birth weight 2 kilograms) got a dose of almost 2 Gy in utero, and at the age of 16 the child had an IQ of 46.
- August 31, 1994 – Commerce Township, Michigan, USA – A home-made neutron source built by 17-year-old David Hahn was discovered in his mother's backyard. The unshielded neutron source exposed his neighborhood to 1,000 times the normal levels of background radiation.
- October 21, 1994 – Theft of radioactive material in Tammiku: a strong caesium-137 source was stolen by scrap metal scavengers in Tammiku, Männiku, Saku Parish, Estonia. The man who carried the source home received a 4,000-rad whole-body dose and died 12 days after first taking it. In addition, the man's stepson sustained radiation burn injuries to his hands after he found and touched the source after the man had placed it inside a kitchen drawer.
- September, 1996 – San José, Costa Rica: A cobalt radiation therapy device was not properly tuned and 116 patients that were undergoing treatment were irradiated with a very high dose.
- May 1998 – Acerinox accident – recycler Acerinox in Cádiz, Spain, unwittingly melted scrap metal containing radioactive sources; the radioactive cloud drifted to Switzerland before being detected.
- December 1998 – Istanbul, Turkey – two sealed transport packages for spent ^{60}Co radiotherapy sources from a shipment of three planned for export in 1993 were instead stored in a warehouse in Ankara, then moved to Istanbul, where a new owner sold them off as scrap metal. The buyers dismantled the containers, exposing themselves and others to ionizing radiation. Eighteen people, including seven children, were admitted to the hospital. Ten of the adults developed acute radiation syndrome. One exposed ^{60}Co source was retrieved, but the source from the other package was still unaccounted for one year later. It is believed that the second container was empty all along, but this could not be conclusively proven from company records.
- 1999 – A road near Mrima Hill, Kenya was rebuilt using local materials later found to be radioactive. Some workers were exposed to excessive radiation, and many residents of the area were tested for exposure. 2,975 t of roadway material were to be dug up to eliminate the hazard.
- 1999 – Yanango, Peru – A construction worker and his family were exposed to an Ir-192 industrial radiography source after the worker picked up the source and carried it in his back pocket for several hours. The exposure received to his whole body was estimated to be approximately 150 rem, and exposure to his right buttocks was 10,000 rad.

== 2000s ==
- February 1, 2000 – Samut Prakan radiation accident: The radiation source of an expired radiotherapy unit was purchased and transferred without registration, and stored in an unguarded car park in Samut Prakan, Thailand without warning signs. It was then stolen from the car park and dismantled in a junkyard for scrap metal. Workers completely removed the ^{60}Co source from the lead shielding, and became ill shortly thereafter. The radioactive nature of the metal and the resulting contamination was not discovered until 18 days later. Seven injuries and three deaths resulted from this incident.
- August 2000 to March 2001 – At the Instituto Oncologico Nacional of Panama, 28 patients receiving treatment for prostate cancer and cancer of the cervix received lethal doses of radiation due to a modification in the protocol for measuring radiation used without a verification test. The negligence, unique in its scope, was investigated by the IAT from May 26 – June 1, 2001.
- February 2001 – A medical accelerator at the Bialystok Oncology Center in Poland malfunctioned, resulting in five female patients receiving excessive doses of radiation while undergoing breast cancer treatment. The incident was discovered when one of the patients complained of a painful radiation burn. In response, a local technician was called in to repair the device, but was unable to do so, and in fact caused further damage. Subsequently, competent authorities were notified, but as the apparatus had been tampered with, they were unable to ascertain the exact doses of radiation received by the patients (localized doses might have been in excess of 60 Gy). No deaths were reported as a result of this incident, although all affected patients required skin grafts. The attending doctor was charged with criminal negligence, but in 2003 a district court ruled that she was not responsible for the incident. The hospital technician was fined.
- December 2, 2001 – Lia radiological accident: In the village of Lia, Georgia three lumberjacks discovered two ^{90}Sr cores from Soviet radioisotope thermoelectric generators (RTGs). These were of the Beta-M type, built in the 80s, with an activity of 1295 TBq each. The lumberjacks were scavenging the forest for firewood when they came across two metal cylinders melting snow within a one-meter radius lying in the road. They picked up these objects to use as personal heaters, sleeping with their backs to them. All lumberjacks sought medical attention individually, and were treated for radiation injuries. One patient, DN-1, was seriously injured and required multiple skin grafts. After 893 days in the hospital, he was declared dead after sepsis caused by complications and infections of a radiation ulcer on the subject's back. The disposal team consisted of 24 men who were restricted to a maximum of 40 seconds worth of exposure (max. 20mSv) each while transferring the canisters to lead-lined drums.
- March 11, 2002 – INES Level 2 – A 2.5-tonne container holding a large amount of ^{60}Co was transported from Cookridge Hospital, Leeds, to Sellafield with defective shielding at the bottom of the container. As the radiation was emitted from the package downward into the ground, it is thought that this event did not cause any injury or disease in either a human or an animal. This event was treated in a serious manner because the defense in depth type of protection for the source had been eroded. Had the container been tipped over in a road crash, people at the scene would have been exposed to 83.5 Gy/h. The company responsible for the transport of the source, AEA Technology plc, was fined £250,000 by a British court.
- 2003 – Cape of Navarin, Chukotka Autonomous Okrug, Russia. An RTG located on the Arctic shore was discovered in a highly degraded state. The exposure rate at the generator surface was as high as 15 R/h; in July 2004 a second inspection of the same RTG showed that gamma radiation emission had risen to 87 R/h and that ^{90}Sr had begun to leak into the environment. In November 2003, a completely dismantled RTG located on the island of Yuzhny Goryachinsky in the Kola Bay was found. The generator's radioactive heat source was found on the ground near the shoreline in the northern part of the island.
- September 10, 2004 – Yakutia, Russia. Two RTGs were dropped 50 meters onto the tundra at Zemlya Bunge island during an airlift when the helicopter flew into heavy weather. According to the nuclear regulators, the impact compromised the RTGs' external radiation shielding. At a height of 10 meters above the impact site, the intensity of gamma radiation was measured at 4 mSv/h.
- 2005 – Dounreay, U.K. In September, the site's cementation plant was closed when 266 liters of radioactive reprocessing residues were spilled inside containment. In October, another of the site's reprocessing laboratories was closed down after nose-blow tests of eight workers tested positive for trace radioactivity.
- 2005-2006 – Epinal radiotherapy accident: a problem in dosimetry software caused an overdosage during radiotherapy. During this period 7500 patients were treated for prostate cancer at the Jean Monnet Hospital in Epinal, France. An investigation showed that 5 people died from radiation, 24 were severely injured, 700 were significantly overexposed, and 4500 were mildly exposed.
- March 11, 2006 – at Fleurus, Belgium, an operator working for Sterigenics, at a medical equipment sterilization site, entered the irradiation room and remained there for 20 seconds. The room contained a source of ^{60}Co which was not immersed in the pool of water. Three weeks later, the worker suffered symptoms typical of acute radiation syndrome (vomiting, loss of hair, fatigue). One estimate that he was exposed to a dose of between 4.4 and 4.8 Gy due to a malfunction of the control-command hydraulic system maintaining the radioactive source in the pool. The operator spent over one month in a specialized hospital before going back home. To protect workers, the federal nuclear control agency FANC and private auditors from AVN recommended Sterigenics to install a redundant system of security. It is an accident of level 4 on the INES scale.
- October 18, 2006 - Teenager Lisa Norris died in 2006 after she was given an overdose of radiation as a result of human error. The overdose occurred during treatment for a brain tumor at Beatson Oncology Centre, in Glasgow, Scotland. The Scottish Government published an independent investigation of this case. The intended treatment for Norris was radiation to be delivered by a linac machine. A dose of 35 Gy was to be delivered to the whole of the central nervous system in twenty equal fractions of 1.75 Gy. This was to then to be followed by 19.8 Gy to be delivered to the tumor only in eleven fractions of 1.8 Gy. In the first phase of the treatment a 58% overdose occurred, and Norris's CNS suffered a dose of 55.5 Gy. The second phase of the treatment was abandoned on medical advice, and Norris survived for some time after the overdose.
- January 23, 2008 – A licensed radiology technologist, Raven Knickerbocker, at Mad River Community Hospital in Arcata, California, USA performed 151 CT scan slices on a single 3 mm level on the head of a 23-month-old child over a 65-minute period. The child suffered radiation burns (skin erythema) to a small strip of his face and head. In one report, an independent investigation of the child's blood was said to have found "substantial chromosomal damage" but subsequent reports reported no lasting harm. The technologist was fired, and her license was permanently revoked on March 16, 2011, by the state of California, citing "gross negligence". The hospital's radiology manager, Bruce Fleck, testified that Knickerbocker's conduct was "a rogue act of insanity".
- August 23–24, 2008 – INES Level 3 – Fleurus, Belgium – Nuclear material leak. A gaseous leak of a radioisotope of iodine, ^{131}I, was detected at a large medical radioisotope laboratory, Institute for Radioelements. Belgian authorities implemented restrictions on use of local farming produce within 5 km of the leak, when higher-than-expected levels of contamination was detected in local grass. The particular isotope of iodine has a half-life of 8 days. The European Commission sent out a warning over their ECURIE-alert system on 29 August. The quantity of radioactivity released into the environment was estimated at 45 GBq ^{131}I, which corresponds to a dose of 160 μSv (effective dose) for a hypothetical person remaining permanently at the site's enclosure.
- February 2008 to August 2009 – A software misconfiguration in a CT scanner used for brain perfusion scanning at Cedars Sinai Medical Center in Los Angeles, California, USA, resulted in 206 patients receiving radiation doses approximately 8 times higher than intended during an 18-month period starting in February 2008. Some patients reported temporary hair loss and erythema. The U.S. Food and Drug Administration (FDA) has estimated that patients received doses between 3 Gy and 4 Gy.

== 2010s ==
- April 2010 – INES level 4 – A 35-year-old man was hospitalized in New Delhi after handling radioactive scrap metal. Investigation led to the discovery of an amount of scrap metal containing ^{60}Co in the Delhi's industrial district of Mayapuri. The 35-year-old man later died from his injuries, while six others remained hospitalized. The radioactivity was from a gammacell 220 research source which was incorrectly disposed of by sale as scrap metal. The gammacell 220 was originally made by Atomic Energy of Canada Limited whose gamma irradiation work is now under the name of Nordion. Nordion does not offer servicing for gammacell 220 machines but can arrange for, in theory, safe disposal of unwanted units. A year later, Delhi Police charged six DU professors from the Chemistry Department for negligent disposal of the radioactive device.
- July 2010 – During a routine inspection at the Port of Genoa, on Italy's northwest coast, a cargo container from Saudi Arabia containing nearly 23,000 kg of scrap copper was detected to be emitting gamma radiation at a rate of around 500 mSv/h. After quarantining the container for over a year on Port grounds, Italian officials dissected it using robots and discovered a rod of ^{60}Co 23 cm long and 0.8 cm in diameter intermingled with the scrap. Officials suspected its provenance to be inappropriately disposed-of medical or food-processing equipment. The rod was sent to Germany for further analysis, after which it was likely to be recycled.
- August 2010 – A caesium-137 radioactive source was fortuitously discovered beneath the asphalt of Stargarder Straße in Prenzlauer Berg, Germany, where it had probably been for the past 20 years. The site was dug up, and the source transferred to the Helmholtz-Zentrum Berlin.
- October 2011 – At a hospital in Rio de Janeiro, a 7-year-old girl was treated for acute lymphoblastic leukemia with whole brain radiation. The prescriptions were done manually in a form with no formal peer review process. Because of an error in the registration of the number of sessions, she received the full dose in each session of radiotherapy. Even with early toxicity, the doctor refused to assess the patient, because some of the complaints were usual. The full treatment was finished in about 8 sessions and the girl was admitted with radiation burns. She developed frontal lobe necrosis and died in June 2012. After an investigation, the physicist, technician, and physician were charged with manslaughter.
- May 2013 – J-PARC radioactive isotope leakage accident. On 23 May 2013, accidental leakage of radioactive isotopes occurred in the high-intensity proton accelerator facility, one of the nuclear research facilities in Tokai-mura, Ibaraki Prefecture. In addition to the diffusion of radioactive isotopes due to the malfunction of equipment, the response to the accident was mishandled, with 33 out of 55 personnel who were on site at the time exposed. A small amount of radioactive isotope leaked outside the controlled area as well. This incident was tentatively evaluated as an INES Level 1 event by the Japanese Nuclear Regulatory Commission.
- May 2013 – A batch of metal-studded belts sold by online retailer ASOS.com were confiscated and held in a U.S. radioactive storage facility after testing positive for ^{60}Co.
- December 2013 – A truck transporting a 111 TBq ^{60}Co radiotherapy source from a Tijuana hospital to a waste storage facility was hijacked near Mexico City. This triggered a nationwide search by Mexican authorities. The truck was found a day later near Hueypoxtla, where it was discovered that the source had been removed from its shielding. The source was found shortly after in a nearby field, where it was safely recovered. The thieves could have received a fatal dose of radiation.
- August 2018 – A 23 kg radioactive source used for industrial radiography (detecting defects in metal weldments) went missing from the back of a pickup truck during transportation in Malaysia. It contains ^{192}Ir and was reported missing on August 10. This is not the first time such an incident happened.

== 2020s ==
- February 2020 – Caesium-137 contamination in Serpong, Indonesia. Radioactive contamination was found on empty land close to a residential building, with estimated dose exposure about 148 mSv/h. Depleted uranium and an empty cylinder were also found in two houses in the same neighborhood. The owner was known to be a retired BATAN (National Nuclear Energy Agency of Indonesia) employee. Decontamination procedure was done by removing 87 drums of radioactive soil, and cutting trees and grass. A measurable Caesium-137 trace was detected on two residents, at 0.12 mSv and 0.5 mSv each.
- May 2021 – In Mumbai, Maharashtra Anti Terrorism Squad arrested two people on 5 May with 7.1 kg of natural uranium estimated worth ₹21.3 crore (US$2.2 million). The National Investigation Agency later took over the case. In March 2024, a special NIA court framed charges against the two men under the Atomic Energy Act, noting that the uranium article had been sold to one accused's father, a scrap dealer, in 2009, and that the pair tried to sell it in 2020 after learning of its supposed value online.
- January 2023 – Western Australian radioactive capsule incident: between 10 January 2023 and 16 January 2023, a radioactive capsule containing a 19 gigabecquerel caesium-137 ceramic source went missing from a truck on which it was being transported across Western Australia. On 27 January 2023, members of the public were warned to observe a safe distance of five metres if they found the capsule, and drivers who had recently used the Great Northern Highway were asked to check their vehicle tyres in case it was lodged in the tread. It was located on the side of the road on 1 February 2023. Authorities said it was unlikely it caused harm to anyone in the time it was lost.
- August 2025 – The United States Food and Drug Administration issued a recall for Indonesian shrimp that contained caesium-137. The source of the isotope was unaccounted for. The shrimp did not pose an acute health risk but was nonetheless dangerous as a source of low-dose exposure.

== See also ==
- Background radiation
- International Nuclear Event Scale
- List of civilian nuclear accidents
- List of military nuclear accidents
- List of nuclear reactors
- List of nuclear whistleblowers
- List of orphan source incidents
- Lists of disasters
- Lists of nuclear disasters and radioactive incidents
- Nuclear power debate
- Nuclear power
- Nuclear reactor
- Radiation
- X-ray
