= ISO 21482 =

Technical standard for radiation warning symbols

ISO 21482:2007
- Ionizing-radiation warning - Supplementary symbol
- ISO 21482 symbol
- Abbreviation: ISO 21482
- First published: February 2007; 18 years ago
- Latest version: 1; 2007
- Organization: International Organization for Standardization
- Committee: ISO/TC 85/SC 2 Radiological protection
- Domain: Radiation safety symbol
- Website: www.iso.org/standard/40264.html

ISO 21482 is a technical standard that specifies the design and usage of a "supplemental radiation warning symbol", a warning symbol. It is intended to warn people of the dangers of radiation hazards posed by sealed sources, and encourage the viewer to get away from the source. The symbol's design was the result of a joint project between the International Atomic Energy Agency (IAEA) and International Organization for Standardization (ISO) in the early 2000s.

The symbol was formally revealed to the public by the IAEA on 15 February 2007.

== Background ==
Lost nuclear sources, or "orphan sources" have presented a hazard to the public dating from at least the early 1960s. These often originated from larger equipment being dismantled by individuals in search of metal for scrap. Even the source itself was often contained in a metal housing that appeared to be valuable.

In the aftermath of repeated incidents where the public was exposed to radiation from orphan sources, a common factor reappeared: individuals who encountered the source were unfamiliar with the trefoil radiation warning symbol, and were in some cases not familiar with the concept of radiation.

During a study in the early 2000s, it was found that only 6% of those surveyed in India, Brazil and Kenya could correctly identify the meaning of the trefoil symbol. Brazil is notable for being the location of the 1987 Goiânia accident, one of the worst incidents involving an orphan source that killed four people, contaminated at least 250 others and caused the contamination of multiple locations and vehicles.

== Process ==
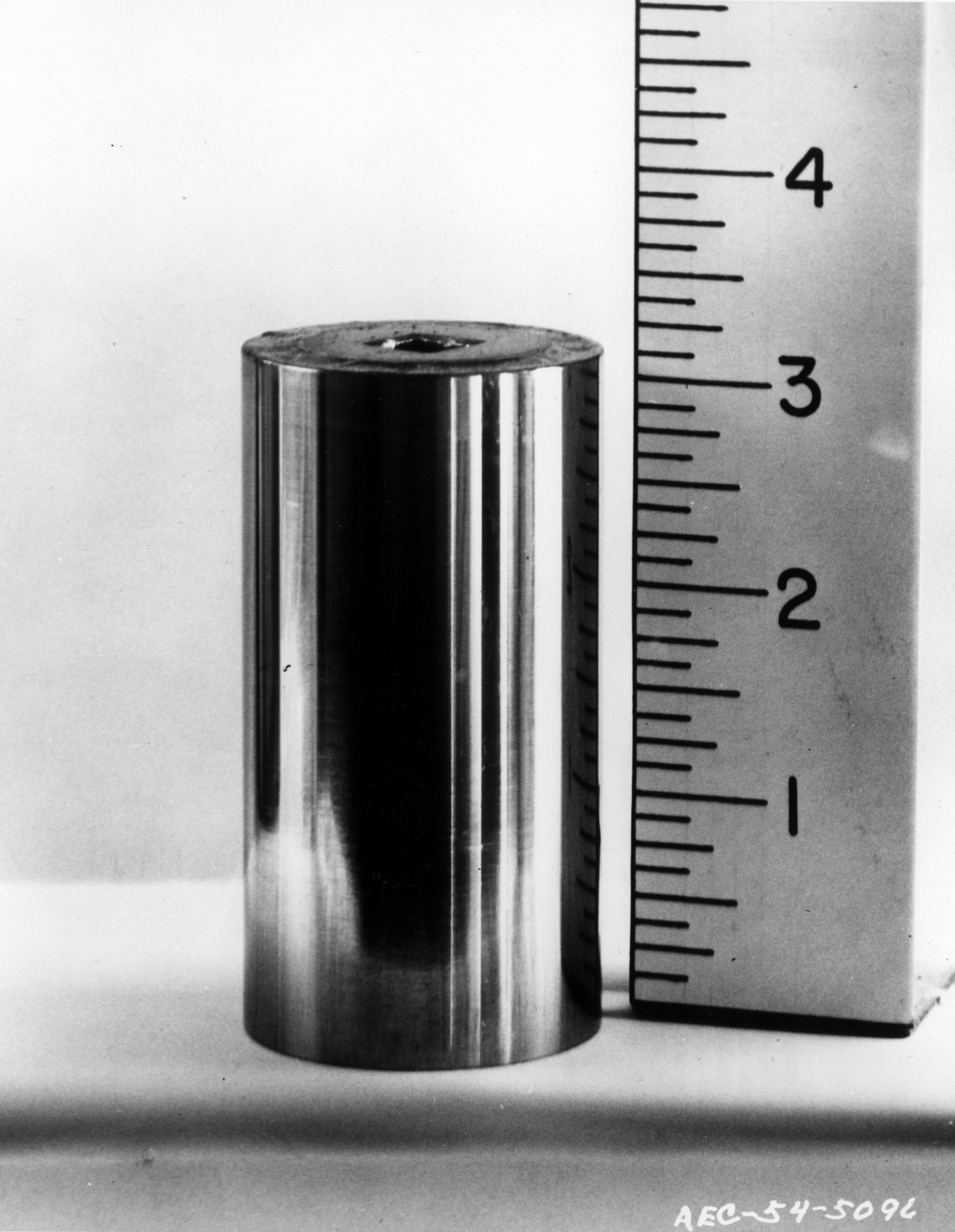
A photograph of a sealed source (left) and the trefoil symbol (right).

In 2001, the "new warning symbol project" was authorized by IAEA Member States. The objective was to create a single symbol, that would be understood worldwide by someone at any age, with nearly any level of education, or not knowing about radiation, as "Danger—Run Away—Do Not Touch!". Five years of work developed 50 symbols as part of the first phase. The symbols were taken to the Vienna International School in Austria. This school's many students hail from over 80 countries, and included children not yet able to read. This enabled personnel to narrow the designs to those that gave off an intuitive message of "danger" or "bad".

This process resulted in five symbols for further consideration. These symbols were then checked by IAEA Member States to confirm that the proposed symbols did not have any negative associations or connections to religion, culture and history.

In 2004, the ISO and Gallup Institute conducted further investigations to determine which of the five symbols were most effective. 1,650 individuals, in 11 countries (Note: Brazil, China, India, Kenya, Mexico, Morocco, Poland, Saudi Arabia, Thailand, Ukraine, United States) were shown the symbols by Gallup staff. These individuals crossed the spectrum: age, education background, gender, rural/urban. Among things assessed by the researchers were: "What were the respondents' initial reactions to the symbols?" and "What action would they take if they saw these symbols?"

It was an eye-opening experience. Initial interpretations of the symbols were that something bad could happen and caution was needed—but the source of that threat wasn't understood. Many thought it was a warning of AIDS, electricity, toxins or even a road hazard.

— Carolyn MacKenzie, an IAEA radiation source specialist

All five symbols were understood to convey "caution", but only the symbol that included a skull conveyed "danger of death".

== Design ==
Symbol in question

The symbol consists of a triangle, with a black border, and a background of Pantone red No. 187, the symbols are black, with a white outline. While yellow is specified in ISO 3864-4 for usage with warning symbols and messages, it was found that red was more effective at conveying "danger" than yellow, which was viewed as the less serious "caution".

The symbol consists of three elements: A trefoil on the top, representing and warning of radiation. Five lines emanate in an arc towards the bottom of the triangle. On the bottom left, there is a skull and crossbones, signifying death. On the bottom right, there is a running figure, with an arrow pointing right, away from the skull and crossbones. The combined icons created a symbol that virtually uniformly conveyed a message of "Danger—Run Away—Do Not Touch!". The use of three separate pictograms, contained within a larger triangular symbol was chosen for its success in inducing the desired response from viewers.

== Function ==
A diagram showing the difference in how the yellow/black trefoil symbol and the red/black ISO 21482 symbol are used on a piece of equipment.

The intended usage of the supplementary radiation warning symbol, is to warn and discourage anyone attempting to dismantle a piece of equipment containing either a IAEA Category 1, 2 or 3 sealed radiation source, which is any sealed source that can cause serious injuries or death if a person is exposed to it.

The symbol is to be placed close to the source, either on its shield or a point of access. The smallest the symbol should be produced is 3.0 centimetres (1.2 in), which makes its placement on most sources difficult due to their small size. The symbol is intended to be hidden from view under normal conditions, and only be revealed to a person when they start attempting to dismantle a piece of equipment, such as removing outer housing of equipment.

The symbol is not intended to replace the trefoil symbol in use since the mid-1940s (ISO 361, also described in ISO 7010/W003), but rather supplement it. It is not intended for use on transport or freight containers, transport vehicles, or on doors and walls of buildings and rooms.

== See also ==
- List of orphan source incidents
- Ionizing radiation symbol (Trefoil)
