= Kramatorsk (disambiguation) =

Kramatorsk (Ukrainian: Краматорськ; Russian: Краматорск) is a city in the eponymous raion and hromada of Donetsk Oblast in Ukraine.

Kramatorsk may also refer to:

- Kramatorsk Raion, a district of Donetsk Oblast, Ukraine
- Kramatorsk Hromada, Kramatorsk Raion, Donetsk Oblast, Ukraine; see List of hromadas of Ukraine
- Kramatorsk Airport, Kramatorsk, Donetsk, Ukraine
- Kramatorsk railway station, Kramatorsk, Donetsk, Ukraine
- Battle of Kramatorsk (2014), at the start of the Donbas War of Secession during the Russo-Ukrainian War
- FC Kramatorsk, a soccer team in Kramatorsk, Kramatorsk, Donetsk, Ukraine
- Ukrainian hovercraft Kramatorsk (U422), a Soviet era Zubr-class LCAC hover landing craft of the Ukrainian Navy

== See also ==
- Kramatorsk radiological accident (1980-1989)
- Kramatorsk railway bombing (2022), during the Russian invasion of Ukraine
- New Kramatorsk Machinebuilding Factory, Kramatorsk, Kramatorsk, Donetsk, Ukraine
