= Samut Prakan radiation accident =

2000 radiation accident in Thailand

- A response team member using tongs to place the retrieved Co-60 radioactive source in a shielded container
- Date: 24 January 2000 – 21 February 2000
- Location: Samut Prakan Province, Thailand; 13°39′22″N 100°35′27″E
- Cause: Radiation accident
- Deaths: 3
- Injuries: 7

A radiation accident occurred in Samut Prakan Province, Thailand in January–February 2000. The accident happened when an insecurely stored unlicensed cobalt-60 radiation source was recovered by scrap metal collectors who, together with a scrapyard worker, subsequently dismantled the container, unknowingly exposing themselves and others nearby to ionizing radiation. Over the following weeks, those exposed developed symptoms of radiation sickness and eventually sought medical attention. The Office of Atomic Energy for Peace (OAEP), Thailand's nuclear regulatory agency, was notified when doctors came to suspect radiation injury, some 17 days after the initial exposure. The OAEP sent an emergency response team to locate and contain the radiation source, which was estimated to have an activity of 15.7 terabecquerels (420 Ci), and was eventually traced to its owner. Investigations found failure to ensure secure storage of the radiation source to be the root cause of the accident, which resulted in ten people being hospitalized for radiation injury, three of whom died, as well as the potentially significant exposure of 1,872 people.

== Background ==
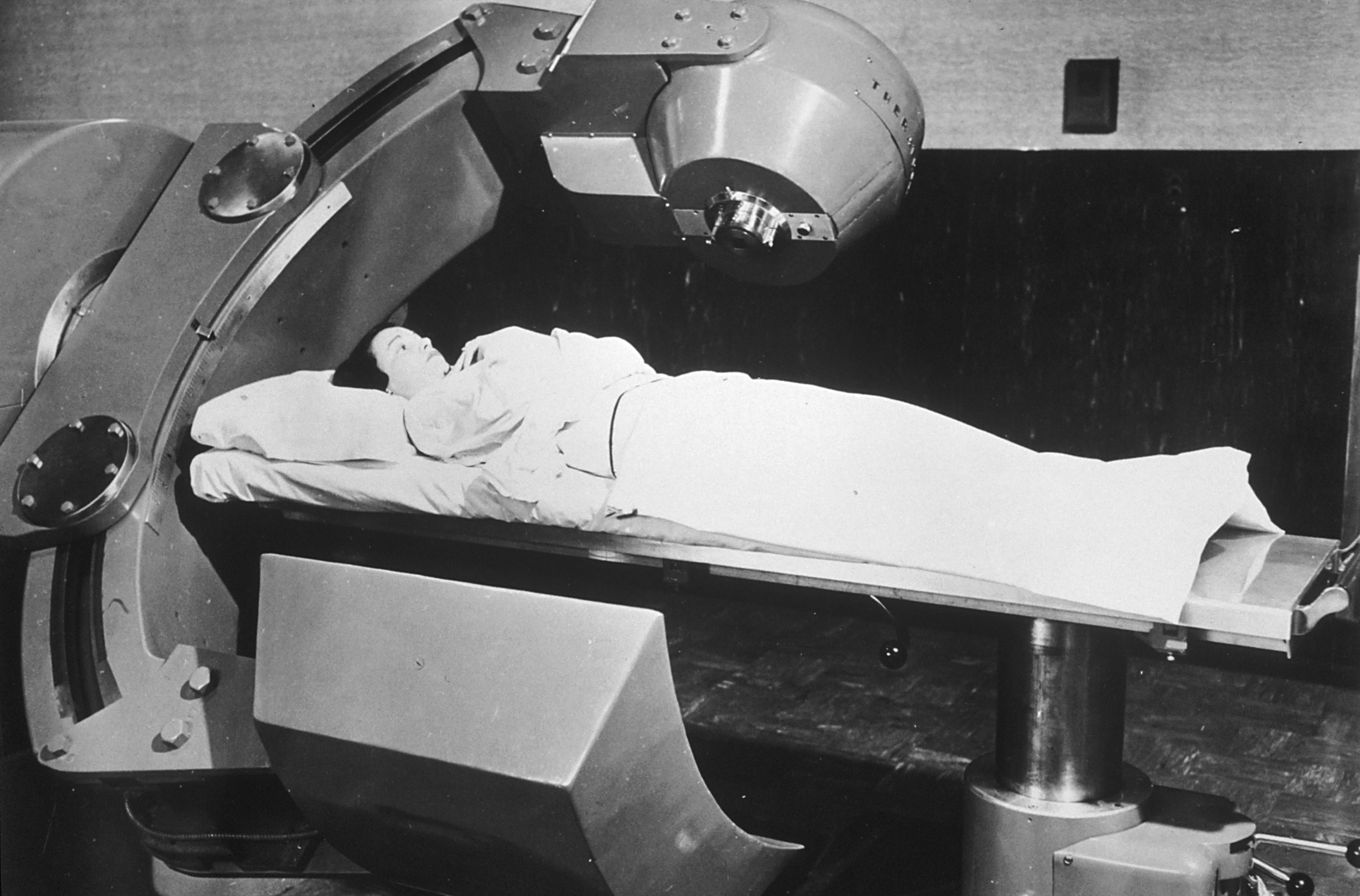
Cobalt-60 is used as a radiation source for radiotherapy (specifically, cobalt therapy).

Cobalt-60 (^{60}Co) is a synthetic radioactive isotope of cobalt, with a half-life of 5.27 years, and emits highly penetrating gamma rays. It is commonly used as a radiation source for radiotherapy and equipment sterilization in hospital settings, and also has industrial uses. The device involved in the Samut Prakan accident was a rotational Gammatron-3 teletherapy unit, manufactured by Siemens and imported to Thailand in 1969. It was licensed for and installed at Ramathibodi Hospital in Bangkok; the radiation source involved was a replacement installed in 1981, with an initial radioactive activity of 196 TBq (5,300 Ci). At the time of the accident in 2000, its activity was estimated to have decayed to 15.7 TBq (420 Ci).

The licensing of radioisotopes and nuclear material for import, export, possession and use in Thailand is regulated by the Thai Atomic Energy Commission for Peace and its working body, the Office of Atoms for Peace (OAP), formerly known as the Office of Atomic Energy for Peace (OAEP). In principle, the licensing process would involve annual safety inspections, but due to lack of personnel and resources, such inspections were not always properly performed, nor were regulatory and control protocols strictly enforced.

The hospital retired the radiotherapy unit in 1994 and acquired a new one from Nordion via its Thai agent Kamol Sukosol Electric Company (KSE). (Note: KSE was the local agent of Theratronics Ltd., who was in that time a subsidiary of MDS Nordion.) The old unit and its ^{60}Co source could not be returned either to its original German manufacturer Siemens, which had stopped producing or servicing them, or to the Canadian supplier Nordion, which was not the original manufacturer. Consequently, the hospital sold the old unit to KSE, which already had another licensed unit in storage. Neither the hospital nor KSE informed the OAEP of the transfer. In 1996 an OAEP inspection found that KSE had three unlicensed units in its warehouse, which had been licensed for the storage of a single unit in 1988.

KSE's lease of the warehouse was terminated in 1999. KSE subsequently returned the licensed unit, while moving the three unregistered units to an unused car park in Bangkok's Prawet District, which was owned by its parent company. The car park was fenced, but the fence had been breached and nearby residents regularly entered to play football in its empty areas. KSE notified the OAEP of its transfer of the licensed unit, but did not mention the other three, which remained orphan sources.

== Accident ==
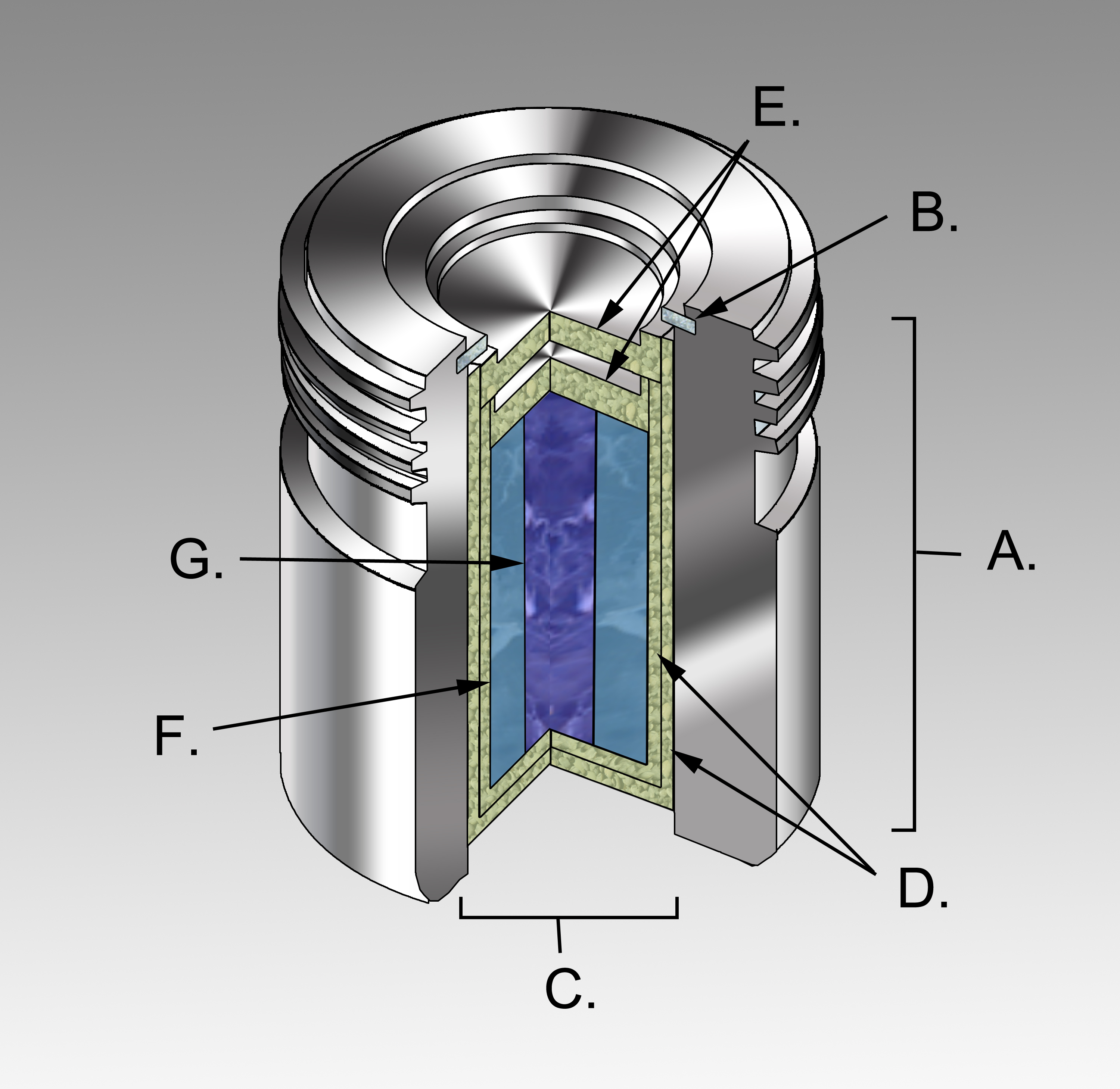
Diagram of a generic teletherapy source unit. The radioactive material (G) is embedded within protective metal canisters.

On 24 January 2000, the part of the radiation therapy unit containing the radiation source was acquired by two scrap collectors, who claimed to have bought it from some strangers as scrap metal for resale. They took it home, planning to dismantle it later. On 1 February, the two, together with another two associates, attempted to dismantle the metal part (a 97-kilogram; 214 lb, 42-by-20-centimetre; 16 x 8 inch lead cylinder held in a stainless steel casing), which was the unit's source drawer. Using a hammer and chisel, they only managed to crack the welded seam. Two of the men then took the metal piece, along with other scrap metal, to a scrapyard on Soi Wat Mahawong in Phra Pradaeng District, Samut Prakan Province. There they asked a worker at the scrapyard to cut open the cylinder using an oxyacetylene torch. As the cylinder was cut open, two smaller cylindrical metal pieces, which had held the source capsule, fell out. The worker retrieved the two pieces and kept them in the scrapyard, but was unaware of the source capsule itself. The lead cylinder was returned to the scrap collectors for them to complete the disassembly.

That same day, the four men present when the cylinder was opened (two of the scrap collectors and two scrapyard employees) began to feel ill, experiencing headaches, nausea and vomiting. The scrap collectors succeeded in taking the lead cylinder apart, and took the parts to sell at the scrapyard the next day. The scrapyard employees continued to feel sick during the following week, and on 12 February the scrapyard owner, believing the metal to be causing the illness, asked the scrap collector to take it elsewhere, and had the two smaller metal pieces thrown away.

By mid-February the symptoms of those involved were worsening. The symptoms included burn wounds, swollen hands, diarrhoea, fever, and hair loss. One of the scrap collectors went to Samut Prakan Hospital on 15 February and was admitted the next day, while the two scrapyard employees were also admitted, on 16 and 17 February. The scrapyard owner's husband was admitted to Bangkok General Hospital on 17 February due to epistaxis (nosebleeds), while the scrapyard owner, her mother, and her maid (all of whom lived across the street from the scrapyard and sometimes entered) also began to feel ill. A stray dog that was often seen in the scrapyard died.

Two of the patients at Samut Prakan Hospital were admitted to the surgical ward, while the other was admitted to the medical ward. All were nauseated and vomiting, and two of them were showing leukopenia (low white blood cell count). Reviewing the cases on 18 February, the doctors realized their symptoms were likely caused by radiation exposure, and notified the OAEP.

== Response ==
Upon receiving notification, the OAEP sent two officers to investigate, who met the doctors and patients at the hospital shortly after noon on 18 February. After questioning the scrapyard owner, they searched for the cylindrical metal pieces initially suspected to be the radiation source, but found that they were not radioactive. They then headed to the scrapyard, and noted abnormally high levels of radiation as they approached, late in the evening. At the scrapyard entrance they measured radiation at an equivalent dose of 1 millisievert per hour (mSv/h) and decided to request additional assistance.

Recognizing the event as a serious radiological accident, the OAEP organized an emergency response team to manage the situation, in conjunction with the local public health and civil defense authorities. They conducted contamination and radiation level surveys and found that there was no contamination, but the radiation dose rate was as high as 10 Sv/h near the source, which kept them from getting close enough to determine what the source was. Surveys to locate the source continued throughout the night. The scrapyard and immediate vicinity were cordoned off, but evacuation was deemed unnecessary.

Retrieval operations began in the afternoon of the following day (19 February 2000), after planning and rehearsing. An excavator was used to clear the way into the scrapyard, and a lead wall was placed to help shield operators from radiation. Scrap metal pieces near the source were removed one by one, using a grasping tool for large pieces, and an improvised electromagnet attached to a 5-metre (16 ft) bamboo rod for smaller ones. A high range radiation dose rate probe was used to screen these metal pieces for radioactivity. A fluorescent screen was used to ultimately determine the exact location of the source, but the team had to wait for cloud cover to reduce moonlight enough to see properly. The source capsule was finally retrieved shortly after midnight and placed in a shielded container. It was identified by in situ gamma spectroscopy as ^{60}Co, and had an estimated activity of 15.7 terabecquerels (420 Ci).

The ^{60}Co source was transferred for storage at the OAEP headquarters. Subsequent surveys found radiation in the scrapyard to have returned to normal background levels. During the same time, the OAEP was informed of the three teletherapy units in the car park, and a separate investigating team found one of the units to have had its drawer assembly missing. This was confirmed to be the origin of the source, and the three units were removed for temporary storage on 21 February.

The OAEP reported the incident to the International Atomic Energy Agency (IAEA), which sent a team of experts on 26 February to assist in the management of the situation and the treatment of those injured.

== Casualties ==
In total, ten people were admitted to hospital with radiation sickness: the four scrap collectors, the two scrapyard employees, the scrapyard owner, her husband, her mother, and her maid. Of these, four people (those working at the scrapyard) were estimated to have received radiation doses of over 6 gray (Gy). All patients were ultimately referred to Rajavithi Hospital, where they received inpatient care. All but one of the patients developed agranulocytosis or bicytopenia (depletion of white blood cells and/or platelets). Several also developed burns, and one (the first scrap collector) had to have his left index finger amputated. Three patients (the two scrapyard workers and the owner's husband) ultimately died of uncontrolled infection and sepsis, all within two months of exposure.

In addition to these casualties, 1,872 people living within 100 metres (330 ft) of the scrapyard were potentially exposed to different levels of ionizing radiation. Physical exams and blood tests were provided to nearly half these people, who sought medical attention. Radiation doses received by OAEP personnel working to recover the radiation source did not exceed 32 mSv, as measured by individual thermoluminescent dosimeters.

== Public reaction and aftermath ==
The trefoil symbol failed to prevent the accident, as it was not recognized by those handling the source container.

The accident became a subject of intense news coverage. The origin of the poorly stored radioactive source was traced to KSE, which was charged with possessing radioactive substances without permission and was fined 15,000 baht (about US$450 in 2015). Environmental Litigation and Advocacy for the Wants (EnLAW), a non-governmental advocacy group, later filed a class action lawsuit against KSE on behalf of the victims, and also against the OAEP in the Administrative Court. The Administrative Court later ruled in 2003 in favour of the plaintiffs, ordering the OAEP to pay 5,222,301 baht ($155,000) as restitution. KSE was ordered by the Civil Court to pay a total of 640,246 baht ($19,000).

In media reports of the accident, several reporters commented negatively on the emergency response team's operation, perceiving them as "not taking the matter [of radiation hazard] seriously" and being unprofessional and lacking training. The BBC told of "officials searching through scrap metal heaps for radioactive waste using sticks and wearing cotton gardening gloves and cloth face-masks". The IAEA defended the team in its report, noting that it included "experienced personnel with expertise in dealing with high radiation fields and control of known contamination", and that they "used innovative means to achieve rapid recovery of the source". It also commented that the lead aprons worn by some members of the response team were not appropriate for use in the situation, as they would not offer adequate protection against ionizing radiation.

As public concern over the accident grew while information and education was limited, misconceptions arose about the nature of radiation hazards. Residents near a Buddhist temple protested and prevented the cremation of one of the victims, believing that the body could spread radiation, despite assurances by the OAEP to the contrary.

The IAEA report noted that the main contributing factors to the accident were: difficulties in the disposal of radiation sources, the OAEP's limited oversight capacity, transfer of the disused source without the OAEP's approval, moving the sources to an unsecured location, lack of understandable warnings, and the dismantling of the device. An article published in Australasian Physical & Engineering Sciences in Medicine commented that "the most serious omission occurred when the medical users ... returned the obsolete units to the Medical Dealer without notifying the OAEP" and that their insecure storage "invited theft". It called for provisions for the safe return and verified disposal of all significant radioactive sources, and stated: "National action is needed to cope with the regulatory problem of orphan sources by maintaining accountability of sources through national registers and the legal enforcement of compliance with the regulations."

The subsequently created ISO 21482 symbol.

The accident, along with other similar events, prompted the IAEA to re-evaluate the effectiveness of the radioactive hazard trefoil as a warning symbol. Although the symbol was displayed on the teletherapy head, none of those handling the device were aware of its meaning, nor were there written warnings in Thai. Together with the International Organization for Standardization (ISO), the IAEA developed a new symbol that would serve as an intuitive warning for large sources of ionizing radiation. The new symbol was published in 2007 as ISO 21482, and is intended to accompany the trefoil on internal components of devices containing dangerous sources to prevent persons from unknowingly disassembling them.

In Thailand substantial efforts to prevent further such occurrences had not materialized in the months following the accident. Labour activists, trade unions and workers were lobbying for the creation of an independent occupational health and safety institute. Social critics pointed out that the accident, along with several prior disasters such as the Kader toy factory fire, was part of a trend in which the country's rapid industrialization resulted in increasing health and environmental hazards due to poor regulations and lack of official willingness to tackle the issue.

Similar incidents occurred in Thailand in 2008, without injuries. In June 2008, a caesium-137 sealed radioactive source was found among scrap metal sold to a scrap dealer in Ayutthaya Province. The dealer recognized the trefoil symbol, and notified the OAP, which responded and found no leak of radiation or contamination. It could not determine the origins of the equipment. In August, a recycling factory in Chachoengsao Province notified the OAP after a piece of scrap metal triggered its gate detector alarm. The OAP found that the piece of metal contained radium-226 sources, and concluded that it originated from unlicensed use in a lightning preventer.

== See also ==
- List of civilian radiation accidents
- Radioactive scrap metal
- List of orphan source incidents
