= Western Australian radioactive capsule incident =

2023 loss and recovery of a caesium-137 capsule

Location of Gudai-Darri iron ore mine, the town of Newman nearest to mine, and the Perth suburb of Malaga

Sometime between 10 and 16 January 2023, a radioactive capsule containing caesium-137 was lost from a truck in Western Australia. The capsule was being transported 1,400 kilometres (870 mi) from Rio Tinto's Gudai-Darri iron ore mine near Newman to a depot in the Perth suburb of Malaga. The Department of Fire and Emergency Services announced to the public on 27 January that the capsule had gone missing, and that the capsule was potentially deadly and could cause burns and radiation sickness. It was discovered on the side of the road near Newman on 1 February.

== The capsule ==
The capsule is 6 mm × 8 mm (0.24 in × 0.31 in) in size, and is used as part of a nucleonic level sensor in the crushing circuit in iron ore mining. The capsule contains 19 gigabecquerel of caesium-137 as a ceramic source. The amount of radiation emitted by the capsule could induce burns and radiation sickness and is potentially deadly to humans.

== Timeline ==
On 10 January 2023, the capsule was packed in order for repair works to be carried out in Perth.

Between 11 and 14 January, the capsule left Rio Tinto's Gudai-Darri mine for transport. The package that was supposed to contain the capsule arrived in Perth on 16 January and was unloaded and placed into secure storage. The package was unpacked for inspection on 25 January; the inspection found that one of four mounting bolts and all screws on the gauge were missing, and the capsule itself was also missing. Authorities surmised that the bolt had worked loose because of vibrations during the 1,400-kilometre (870 mi) journey, and then the capsule had fallen through the bolt hole.

On the evening of 25 January, the Department of Fire and Emergency Services (DFES) was notified of the missing capsule by the Western Australia Police Force.

The Chief Health Officer of Western Australia, Andrew Robertson, held an emergency press conference, with DFES issuing an "urgent public health warning" on 27 January. Members of the public were warned to observe a safe distance of 5 metres (16 ft) if they found the capsule, and drivers who had recently used the Great Northern Highway were asked to check their vehicle tyres in case it was lodged in the tread.

A search was carried out after the capsule was reported missing, with more than 100 personnel involved. The DFES Agency flew out scientists from the eastern states to operate a Geiger Counter. Agencies assisting the search included the Australian Radiation Protection and Nuclear Safety Agency, WA Police, DFES, and the Australian Nuclear Science and Technology Organisation.

The capsule was found next to a road on 1 February, 74 kilometres (46 mi) south of Newman by a search crew vehicle travelling past it at 70 kilometres per hour (43 mph). The presence was noticed when the detection equipment picked up radiation emitted by the capsule. Authorities said it was unlikely it caused harm to anyone in the time it was lost.

== Responses ==
Prime Minister Anthony Albanese has criticised the low penalty for losing radioactive materials in Western Australia. Under the Radiation Safety Regulations Act, the maximum penalty for failing to safely store, pack and transport radioactive materials is a A$1,000 fine. The Government of Western Australia has stated it will review the penalties for mishandling radioactive materials, but any change will not be retroactive. In July 2023, it was confirmed Rio Tinto would not be fined as "no breaches of the radiation safety act had been identified" when the "tiny, but potentially deadly" capsule was lost, although "issues stemming from the investigation [...] to provide input into updates of national safety standards" continue to be considered.

Rio Tinto offered to pay for the search costs. After discussion with Western Australia government, Rio donated a mobile camp worth $4 million to assist in flood recovery of Fitzroy Crossing, in lieu of cash payment.

The search and subsequent recovery of the capsule has been likened to finding a "needle in a haystack" by the media and authorities.

== See also ==
- Kambalda Nickel Operations: Open source incident
- Kramatorsk radiological accident
- Goiânia accident
- List of orphan source incidents
