= List of orphan source incidents =

This is a chronological list of orphan source incidents and accidents.

Metric prefixes are used where appropriate: kilo (k), mega (M), giga (G), tera (T).

Note: As incident reporting has used inconsistent units of measurement, the table below shows conversion factors.

| Property | non-SI unit | SI unit equivalent |
|---|---|---|
| Radioactivity | 1 Curie (Ci) | 37 gigabecquerels (GBq) |
| Equivalent radiation dose | 1 rem | 0.01 Sievert (Sv) |
| Absorbed radiation dose | 1 rad | 0.01 Gray (Gy) |

== 20th century ==
=== 1960s ===
- 1962 – Mexico City – 1962 Mexico City radiation accident in which a boy brought home an unshielded cobalt-60 capsule, radiation from which killed all of the family members but one.
- January 11, 1963 – Sanlian, Hefei, Anhui, China – A 10 Ci (370 GBq) cobalt-60 source from an industrial seed irradiator was removed from a buried waste repository and taken to a residence by a child. Over the next 5–9 days, six total family members were exposed. Two died and four were injured.
- May 3, 1968 – La Plata, Argentina – A construction worker at a chemical plant discovered a caesium-137 source and carried it in his pants pocket for 17 hours (right pocket for 7 hours, left pocket for 10 hours). The worker suffered a localized dose of 50–1,700 rad (0.50–17.00 Gy), leading to permanent sterility and the eventual amputation of both legs. 17 workers were exposed to an estimated dose of 40 rad (0.40 Gy).
- September 18, 1968 – F.R. Germany – An iridium-192 source was mishandled by workers, with one person placing the source in their jacket pocket. Six workers were exposed, with one receiving a 100 rad (1.0 Gy) whole body dose and 4,000–6,000 rad (40–60 Gy) localized dose to their pelvic and thigh regions.

=== 1970s ===
- 1971 – Chiba, Japan – a 5.26 Ci (195 GBq) iridium-192 source used for industrial radiography was lost. Six construction workers received doses of 15–130 rem (0.15–1.30 Sv).
- January 8, 1977 – Sasolburg, Free State, South Africa – a 6.7 Ci (250 GBq) iridium-192 source fell out of its container at a construction site. The radiographer did not notice the loss of the source and left the site. A construction supervisor later picked up the source and placed it in his shirt pocket. He travelled home and placed the source in a cupboard. The source was recognized as lost two days later after workers were shown a replica and it was recovered the same day. The supervisor received a whole body dose of 116 rad (1.16 Gy) and required the amputation of two fingers. His wife and child received doses of 17 rad (0.17 Gy) and 10 rad (0.10 Gy) respectively.
- May 5, 1978 – Sétif, Algeria – A 25 Ci (920 GBq) iridium-192 source fell off a truck during transport. Two children found it and kept it for several days before giving it to their grandmother, who kept it in the kitchen of her home. After 38 days radiation exposure was identified by medical personnel. The grandmother died of radiation injuries, and six members of her family received varying radiation injuries.
- November 14, 1978 – Kambalda East, Western Australia, Australia – A density gauge containing caesium-137 at the Kambalda Nickel Operations was discovered to be missing. Subsequently, caesium-137 radiation contamination was found at a furnace in Singapore which had accepted scrap metal from the Kambalda operation. After years of negotiation, 119 drums of slightly contaminated waste, holding bricks and sludge from the Singapore furnace, were eventually transported to Western Australia in December 1981 and stored in a bunker at Kambalda.
- June 5, 1979 – Los Angeles, California, United States – A 28 Ci (1,000 GBq) iridium-192 source was lost on a job site. A worker picked it up and carried it in his pocket for 45 minutes before giving it to a manager. The worker received a 68 rem (0.68 Sv) whole body dose and a 1.5 Mrem (15 kSv) surface dose (60 krem (600 Sv) at 1-cm; ⅜ inch depth) to his buttocks.

=== 1980s ===
- October 5, 1982 – Baku, Azerbaijan SSR – An individual carried a caesium-137 source in their pocket, exposing several individuals. Five people died and 13 others were exposed, including one person who suffered ARS.
- 1982 – Vikhroli, Mumbai, India – An iridium-192 source was lost during transport. A railway worker who found the source suffered significant exposure.
- December 6, 1983 – Ciudad Juárez, Mexico. Ciudad Juárez cobalt-60 contamination incident. A local resident salvaged materials from a discarded radiation therapy machine containing 6,010 pellets of cobalt-60. The transport of the material led to severe contamination of his truck. Remaining pellets in the scrapyard contaminated another 5,000 metric tonnes of steel to an estimated 300 Ci (11 TBq) of activity. This steel was used to manufacture kitchen and restaurant table legs and rebar, some of which was shipped to the U.S. and Canada. The incident was discovered months later when a truck delivering contaminated building materials to the Los Alamos National Laboratory drove through a radiation monitoring station. Contamination was later measured on roads used to transport the original damaged radiation source. Some pellets were actually found embedded in the roadway. In the state of Sinaloa, 109 houses were condemned due to use of contaminated building material. This incident prompted the U.S. Nuclear Regulatory Commission and Customs Service to install radiation detection equipment at all major border crossings.
- March 19, 1984 – Casablanca, Morocco – A 16.3 Ci (600 GBq) iridium-192 source was lost and taken home by a laborer, who placed the source on a table in the family bedroom. The source remained in the house for several weeks. Eight people died and three were injured.
- September 13, 1987 – In the Goiânia accident, scavengers broke open a radiation-therapy machine in an abandoned clinic in Goiânia, Brazil. They sold the 1,375 Ci (50.9 TBq) caesium-137 source as a glowing curiosity. Two hundred and fifty people were contaminated; four died.
- 1980-1989 - The Kramatorsk radiological accident occurred in Kramatorsk in the Ukrainian SSR. In the late 1970s, a radioactive capsule from a radiation gauge was lost in a quarry; quarried gravel and the capsule were later used to construct the walls of an apartment building. A family consisting of a mother, daughter, and son were all diagnosed with leukemia and died within two years whilst living in the contaminated unit. A father and his two sons moved in shortly afterward. The two sons were also diagnosed and died of leukemia within 2 years. The father pushed for an investigation which led to the discovery of the cesium-137 in the wall.

=== 1990s ===
- 1990 – Sasolburg, Free State, South Africa – A cobalt-60 source was left behind following radiography work. Six people handled the source for approximately 5–20 minutes.
- November 19, 1992 – A 10 Ci (370 GBq) cobalt-60 source (which was used for an agricultural project) was taken home by a worker from a well within a construction site which used to be part of an environmental monitoring station in Xinzhou, Shanxi, China. This resulted in three deaths and affected 100+ people. A woman was exposed to radiation while nursing her sick husband. 41 days after the accident, her dose was estimated to be 2.3 Gy (230 rad) by means of a blood test. Her then unborn child (induced at 37 weeks, with a birth weight of 2 kilograms; 4 lb) received a dose of almost 2 Gy (200 rad) in utero; at the age of 16, the child had an IQ of 46. Eight years after the event, her second baby died because of an incident six months into pregnancy. 16 years after the accident, the woman suffered from premature aging.
- November 16-December 1, 1992 - Ohio, United States - 1992 Pennsylvania Brachytherapy Incident. An iridium-192 source used for remote afterloader brachytherapy was accidentally left inside the patient after its source wire broke. Radiation alarms went off, but were ignored by staff due to a history of false alarms. The patient, an 82-year-old woman named Sara Mildred Colgan, returned to her nursing home with the source still in her tumor. Four days later, on November 20, the source fell out, and was put into normal biomedical waste storage because it was not recognized as radioactive. Colgan died the next day, on November 21, as a result of the radiation overdose. The source was not found until it set off radiation alarms at a biomedical waste incineration site on December 1. During the 10 days between her death and the recovery of the source, almost 90 people were exposed to radiation, but no other deaths resulted.
- October 21, 1994 – Estonia – Theft of radioactive material in Tammiku. A caesium-137 source was stolen from a waste storage facility by three brothers. One received a 4,000 rad whole-body dose and died 12 days later. His family's dog also died, and his stepson developed radiation burns on his hands after touching the source.
- 1995 – France – A worker disassembled a density gauge at a textile treatment plant and handled a 0.2 Ci (7.4 GBq) cesium-137 source for 30–45 minutes.
- January 5, 1996 – Jilin, Xinzhou, China – A worker found a 2.765 TBq (74.7 Ci) iridium-192 source on the ground. He held it in his hand for 15 minutes before putting the source in his pants pocket. The man received a 290 rad (2.9 Gy) whole body dose as well as large localized doses to the left hand, left wrist, and right thigh.
- June 1996 – October 9, 1997 – Lilo, Tbilisi, Georgia – 11 servicemen at the Lilo Training Center were hospitalized for symptoms found to be consistent with radiation exposure between April and September 1997. An additional hospitalization in June 1996 was later recognized as having been caused by radiation exposure. An investigation in October 1997 found a number of sources throughout and around the property, including 200 radium-226 coated gun sights. The primary and most active source, a metal cylinder containing cesium-137 with an estimated dose rate of 13 mGy (1.3 rad)/h at 1 meter's distance, was found in the pocket of a winter jacket stored in an underground shelter. It was estimated that the servicemen were exposed intermittently via the jacket over a period ranging from 60 to 300 days. It is believed that the radiation sources were training material left over from Soviet use of the installation, and a further 352 contaminated sites were identified within the country during subsequent investigations spurred by this incident.
- July 24, 1996 – Gilan, Iran – A radiographer was using a 5 Ci (180 GBq) iridium-192 source to check boiler welds at a power plant. The source become detached from the device cable and fell into a trench where it was found by a worker who put it into his chest pocket. The worker carried around the source, at times removing it from his pocket and examining it. After approximately 90 minutes he began to experience nausea, dizziness and a burning sensation in his chest; he then returned the source to the trench and left it where he found it. The source was recovered by operators, unaware it had been handled in the intervening period. The worker received a whole body dose of 450 rem (4.5 Sv).
- December 2, 1997 – Volgograd, Russia – An accidental exposure to an iridium-192 source caused 1 injury.
- 1997 – Georgia – A medical teletherapy cobalt-60 source was left unsecured near a station, causing a fatal radiation exposure to one individual.
- May 1998 - Algeciras, Spain - Acerinox accident. A cesium-137 source was inadvertently melted in the Acerinox stainless steel plant in Algeciras. Six people were mildly contaminated.
- December 1998 – Istanbul, Turkey – two sealed transport packages for spent cobalt-60 teletherapy sources from a shipment of three planned for export in 1993 were instead stored in a warehouse in Ankara, then moved to Istanbul, where a new owner sold them off as scrap metal. The buyers dismantled the containers, exposing themselves and others to ionizing radiation. Eighteen people, including seven children, were admitted to hospital. Ten of the adults developed acute radiation syndrome. One exposed cobalt-60 source was retrieved, but the source from the other package was still unaccounted for one year later. It is believed that the second container was empty all along, but this could not be conclusively proven from company records.
- February 20, 1999 – Yanango, Peru – A welder picked up an iridium-192 source lost by an industrial radiographer working at a hydroelectric plant and placed it in his rear pants pocket. The source was kept in the pocket for several hours, then brought home. The welder received severe exposure to the thigh, requiring the amputation of the leg. His wife and child were also exposed to a lesser extent, and the source was recovered shortly after midnight.
- April 26–28, 1999 – Henan, China – A radiotherapy unit was sold as scrap to a waste disposal company, where its cobalt-60 source was removed from its shielding. A scrap metal dealer purchased the source, then brought it into his home where he placed it in the bedroom of his wife and child. The family suffered from acute radiation sickness and later recovered. The source was identified and removed 24 hours after its sale.
- 1999 – Kingisepp, Leningrad Oblast, Russia – The radioisotope core of a radio thermal generator was recovered at a bus station in Kingisepp. Radiation levels at the surface of the source were 1,000 rad (10 Gy)/hour. The source had been stolen from a lighthouse 50 km (30 miles) away by three men stealing metal to sell as scrap; all three died of radiation injury.

== 21st century ==
=== 2000s ===
- February 1, 2000 – Samut Prakan radiation accident: The radiation source of an expired teletherapy unit was purchased and transferred without registration, and stored in an unguarded car park in Samut Prakan, Thailand without warning signs. It was then stolen from the car park and dismantled in a junkyard for scrap metal. Workers completely removed the cobalt-60 source from the lead shielding, and became ill shortly thereafter. The radioactive nature of the metal and the resulting contamination was not discovered until 18 days later. Seven injuries and three deaths resulted from this incident.
- May – July 2000 – Meet-Halfa village in Qalyubia, Egypt, where a farmer found and brought home a source of iridium-192, which had been used to inspect welding on natural gas pipelines. Two household members died; 5 were injured with skin, bone marrow, and/or muscle damage. An additional 76 others were treated for changes to their blood. Four people were charged with manslaughter and gross negligence for failing to inform the authorities that they had lost the source.
- August 16, 2000 – Samara Oblast, Russia – A 240 Ci (8.9 TBq) iridium-192 source became detached from its shield assembly while being used by three radiographers to check welds in a gas pipeline. The unshielded source was packed into the workers' vehicle, in which they also slept that night. The next morning all three workers experienced nausea and vomiting. After returning to their base, the loose source was not discovered for eight days. When discovered, one of the radiographers picked up the source with his bare hand to return it to its container, receiving a localized dose of 3,000–7,000 rad (30–70 Gy) to his hand. All three suffered whole body doses of 10–300 rad (0.10–3.00 Gy) from sleeping in the vehicle containing the unshielded source.
- December 2, 2001 – Lia radiological accident: In the village of Lia, Georgia, three lumberjacks discovered two strontium-90 cores from Soviet radioisotope thermoelectric generators. These were of the Beta-M type, built in the 80s, with an activity of 1,295 TBq (35.0 kCi) each. The lumberjacks were scavenging the forest for firewood, when they came across two metal cylinders melting snow within a one meter radius lying in the road. They picked up these objects to use as personal heaters, sleeping with their backs to them. All lumberjacks sought medical attention individually, and were treated for radiation injuries. One patient, DN-1, was seriously injured and required multiple skin grafts. After 893 days in the hospital, he was declared dead after sepsis caused by complications and infections of a radiation ulcer on the subject's back. The disposal team consisted of 24 men who were restricted to a maximum of 40 seconds worth of exposure (max. 20 mSv (2.0 rem)) each while transferring the canisters to lead-lined drums.
- November 12–13, 2003 – Kola Harbor, Polyarny, Russia – Inspectors discovered scrap metal thieves had disassembled the radio-thermal generators at two separate lighthouses around Kola Bay. The 5-kg (11 lb) 35 kCi (1,300 TBq) strontium-90 sources were found, removed from their shielding, nearby. With their depleted uranium shielding removed, the dose rate for a single source was 800–1,000 rem (8.0–10.0 Sv)/hour at a distance of 2–5 cm (1 to 2 inches). The perpetrators likely sustained radiation injuries or even fatal doses; but authorities were unsuccessful in locating them.
- March 23, 2008 – Rades, Tunisia – A worker carried an unshielded iridium-192 source by hand for an unspecified period. The worker sustained a 200 rem (2.0 Sv) whole body dose.
- April 2009 – Ecuador – A construction worker picked up a loose 16 Ci (590 GBq) radiography source and carried it next to his left leg for an unspecified period, causing significant localized exposure.

=== 2010s ===
- April 2010 – Mayapuri, New Delhi, India – INES level 4 – A 35-year-old man was hospitalized in New Delhi after handling radioactive scrap metal. Investigation led to the discovery of an amount of scrap metal containing cobalt-60 in Delhi's industrial district of Mayapuri. The man later died from his injuries, while six others remained hospitalized. The radioactivity was from a Gammacell 220 research source which was incorrectly disposed of by sale as scrap metal. The Gammacell 220 was originally made by Atomic Energy of Canada Limited (whose radio-chemical division is now known as Nordion). A year later, Delhi Police charged six Delhi University professors from the Chemistry Department for negligent disposal of the radioactive device.
- June 3, 2010 – Turmero, Aragua, Venezuela – An unshielded iridium-192 source was handled by several workers, one of whom received a significant enough exposure to necessitate transport to France for medical treatment.
- July 2010 – During a routine inspection at the Port of Genoa, on Italy's northwest coast, a shipping container from Saudi Arabia containing nearly 23,000 kg (50,000 lb) of scrap copper was detected to be emitting gamma radiation at a rate of around 500 mSv (50 rem)/h. After quarantining the container for over a year on Port grounds, Italian officials dissected it using robots and discovered a rod of cobalt-60, 23 cm (9 inches) long and 0.8 cm (⅓ inch) in diameter, intermingled with the scrap. Officials suspected its provenance to be inappropriately disposed-of medical or food-processing equipment. The rod was sent to Germany for further analysis, after which it was likely to be recycled.
- December 2013 – A truck transporting a 111 TBq (3.0 kCi) cobalt-60 teletherapy source from a Tijuana hospital to a waste storage facility was hijacked near Mexico City. This triggered a nationwide search by Mexican authorities. The truck was found a day later near Hueypoxtla, where it was discovered that the source had been removed from its shielding. The source was found shortly after in a nearby field, where it was safely recovered. The thieves could have received a fatal dose of radiation.

=== 2020s ===
- January 2023 – Western Australian radioactive capsule incident: A capsule of caesium-137 went missing from a truck in Western Australia somewhere along a stretch of highway 1,400 kilometres (870 miles) long while being transported between a mine in the Pilbara region and a depot in Perth. After an extensive search the ceramic source, with an activity of 19 GBq (0.51 Ci), was recovered without incident six days after it was discovered missing.
- March 2023 – A radiographic camera containing radioactive material went missing from a work truck belonging to the Statewide Maintenance Company in Houston, Texas, United States; it was returned intact in May 2023.
- March 2023 – Four iridium-192 sources (with radioactivity levels of 35.64, 7.61, 1.14 and 0.11 Ci) were stolen, along with the truck being used to transport them, in Salamanca, Guanajuato, Mexico. An alert covering seven central states was issued. The sources were recovered six days later after an anonymous call.
- June 2023 - Two caesium-137 sources were reportedly stolen from a mining facility in Nazareno, Minas Gerais, Brazil, where they were being used in density measuring equipment. The National Nuclear Energy Commission has stated that these sources are 300,000 times weaker than the one involved in the 1987 Goiânia accident, with an activity of 5 mCi each (0.185 GBq), or 10 mCi combined (0.37 GBq). On July 10, the two sources were found on a scrapyard in São Paulo, 432 km (268 miles) away from their original location. They were sent to the Nuclear and Energy Research Institute for analysis to determine their integrity, dosage and usage conditions.
- May/June 2024 - A sealed source containing 1µg of Americium-241 was left at the swap shop at Electromagnetic Field, a technology-focused camping festival in the United Kingdom. The source was recovered for later disposal by a festival attendee who works in the nuclear sector. The attendee gave a talk about the incident at the next Electromagnetic Field which took place in July 2026.
- July 2024 - A van containing five drums of Technetium-99 and Germanium-68 was stolen in São Mateus, in eastern São Paulo. Although the theft happened on the 1st of June, the National Nuclear Energy Commission only made this information public on the 5th of July. Authorities claim said sources have "an extremely low radioactive risk to the general population", and advise the public to keep their distance and call the police if any of the drums is found. As of July 5th, one of the drums, blue in colour, was found open in a wasteland area.
- October 2025 - The contamination of shrimp and cloves from Indonesia was traced back to a stainless steel smelter in Jakarta and hence to a scrapyard, from where the wind carried caesium-137 less than 2 km (1¼ miles) away to a seafood processing plant. Six people from the industrial park were hospitalized.
- April 2026 - Two sealed industrial radiography sources containing iridium-192 were discovered by a civilian near Pivka, Slovenia. The objects were recovered by ELME (Ecological laboratory with mobile unit) and transferred to the Central Interim Storage for Radioactive Waste (ARAO) for storage.
- July 2026 - A sealed (special form) source containing a caesium-137 capsule was unearthed in Midland, Texas near S County Road 1210 by the Texas Department of Public Safety (DPS) Radiological/Nuclear Threat Detection (Rad/Nuc) Unit while an Officer was on routine patrol. The source was covered by 6 to 8 inches of soil when unearthed and transferred to authorities for proper disposal. The source was originally 100 mCi in April 1967 and about 25.5 mCi when discovered.

== See also ==
- Acute radiation syndrome
- Nuclear and radiation accidents and incidents
- International Nuclear and Radiological Event Scale
- List of nuclear and radiation accidents by death toll
