= 1992 Pennsylvania brachytherapy incident =

Orphan source incident

The 1992 Pennsylvania brachiotherapy incident was an orphan source incident that took place at the Indiana Regional Cancer Center in the borough of Indiana, Pennsylvania, United States, from November 16–December 1, 1992. After an accident with afterloaded remote brachytherapy that resulted in the death of the patient, Sara Colgan, the radioactive source was inadvertently placed in normal biomedical waste storage. Other than the patient, 94 people were exposed to ionizing radiation but none received a high enough dose to cause acute radiation syndrome or other clinical signs.

== Initial accident ==
On November 16, 1992, 82-year-old Sara Colgan was treated for anal carcinoma with afterloaded remote brachytherapy. In this procedure, a radioactive source (in this case an iridium-192 source of about 4 curies) inside a hollow wire is inserted via catheter directly into the affected area. The source was inserted remotely to reduce staff's exposure to radiation, using an Omnitron 2000 afterloader.

During the procedure, part of the wire containing the source broke off, leaving part of the device inside Colgan's body. Although radiation alarms went off, the control console indicated it was safe; given previous incidents of false alarms, staff dismissed the alarm. One therapy technician unplugged the detector and plugged it back in again to stop the alarm. Despite safety protocols, no handheld detector was used to double-check for radiation. Colgan was discharged from the hospital after the procedure, and returned to her residence in a nursing home. On November 17, she requested that the second course of radiation be rescheduled due to her "inability to tolerate the radiation again." Four days later, on November 20, the catheter containing the source slipped out. Nursing home staff, not recognizing it as a radioactive source, handled it as they would any biomedical waste and disposed of it according to typical biohazard protocol. Colgan died on November 21 (5 days after the procedure), at the nursing home, having been exposed to 2,000–10,000 sieverts of radiation. According to the Indiana Plain Dealer, she was aware of the presence of the source and reportedly warned others not to touch her; official reports do not mention any such warning. On December 18, her body was exhumed for autopsy by Dr. Isadore Mihalakis, a pathologist who was otherwise unconnected to the case. The press report from the Indiana County Coroner, published on January 23, 1993, confirmed the cause of death to be "Acute Radiological Exposure and Consequences Thereof."

== Orphan source incident ==
From November 20 through November 25, the source stayed in biomedical waste storage (also known as "red bag" waste) at the nursing home, potentially exposing staff, residents, and visitors to radiation. On Wednesday, November 25, a truck from Browning-Ferris Industries (BFI) picked up this waste. Despite having a functional radiation detector, and contrary to company safety policy, the driver did not screen the waste for radioactivity at any point during the loading or transport process. The truck containing the source drove to a facility in Carnegie, Pennsylvania, where the red bag waste was transferred to a trailer. Since the next day (November 26) was Thanksgiving, the trailer stayed at Carnegie until early in the morning of Friday, November 27, when a second driver delivered it to an incineration facility in Warren, Ohio. At the Warren facility, radiation detectors identified the trailer's contents as radioactive. In direct defiance of Department of Transportation regulations surrounding the transport of nuclear material, the waste was driven back to Carnegie without legally-mandated warning labels or any kind of notification of authorities. The truck stayed in the Carnegie facility over the weekend of November 28–29, to be inspected by BFI employees the following Monday. On November 30, these BFI employees, despite having neither the equipment nor the experience necessary to safely work with the radioactive hazard, attempted to search the trailer themselves. Due to the lapse in safety measures, some employees were exposed to radiation. The next day, they continued the search and successfully traced the origin of the red bag waste to the nursing home, which in turn contacted the Indiana Regional Cancer Center. The IRCC's medical physicist determined that the source was no longer in the afterloader, and concluded that the source must have been lost and ended up in the red bag waste. Only then—four days after the radiation was discovered—was the NRC informed of the events. The source was then retrieved and placed into a shielded container.

== Radiological impact ==
Overall, 94 people were exposed to radiation from the source. No occupational exposure exceeded the NRC limit of 0.0125 sieverts, but an unspecified number of members of the public were exposed to radiation in excess of applicable limits.

Dose range (sieverts)	Estimated number of people exposed
0.0 – 0.005	42
0.005 – 0.01	11
0.01 – 0.05	20
0.05 – 0.1	13
0.1 – 0.15	7
0.15 – 0.20	1

Neither the cancer center nor the nursing home had lasting radioactive contamination, as the iridium stayed contained in the pellet.

== Secondary incident ==
A second, unrelated incident occurred on December 7, 1992, at the Greater Pittsburgh Cancer Center in Pittsburgh, Pennsylvania. This case also involved the snapping of the source wire, but the medical physicist attending the patient promptly reacted to the alarm by removing the source with forceps and placing it in a shielded container. No radiological consequences resulted.

== Causes ==
A report by the US Nuclear Regulatory Commission concluded Omnitron's testing for source wires was insufficient. They did not perform metallurgical testing on the wires to ensure they were free of impurities, nor did they calculate tensile or shear stresses that the wire would be subjected to. The wire, made of a nickel-titanium shape-metal alloy, may also have been embrittled by a dilute hydrogen fluoride solution created by the teflon packaging in which the wire was shipped. In late September 1992 (2–3 months before the incidents), Omnitron replaced the teflon lining with stainless steel, as the teflon was visibly degraded where it was in contact with the source wire. This was treated primarily as a durability concern for the teflon, and Omnitron did not test the source wire for potential damage; source wires packaged prior to the switch were still in use and assumed safe.

== Regulatory consequences ==
At the time of the incident, there were no regulatory guidelines for radiation safety in the waste disposal industry. Although similar rules existed for the steel and scrap-metal industry, which had experienced previous radioactive scrap metal incidents, waste disposal was under-regulated. BFI's aggressive radiation-monitoring program was likely the only reason the waste was not incinerated. Even with these company-specific measures, the waste was still transported a significant distance across state lines, and no government agency was made aware of the incident for four days after the initial discovery of the material. The case also raised doubt about the cancer center's safety protocols. The radiation oncologist involved was barred from NRC-licensed activities for safety violations both related and unrelated to the case.

== See also ==
- Therac-25
- Clinic of Zaragoza radiotherapy accident
