= Trần Đức Thiệp =

Vietnamese nuclear scientist

- Born: 1949 (age 76–77); Yên Hồ ward, Đức Thọ district, Hà Tĩnh province, Vietnam
- Education: Sofia University (BS, PhD)
- Scientific career
- Fields: Particle physics
- Workplaces: Institute for Nuclear Science and Technology; Vietnam Academy of Science and Technology

Trần Đức Thiệp (Vietnamese: Trần Đức Thiệp; Vietnamese: [t͡ɕə̀n ʔɗɨ́k̚ tʰiə̣p̚ʔ]) (born 1949) is a Vietnamese nuclear scientist and former deputy director of Vietnam Academy of Science and Technology. In 1992, he accidentally put his hand over an electron beam, leading to amputation of his right hand and International Atomic Energy Agency's investigation of safety practices of Hanoi's Institute for Nuclear Science and Technology.

== Early life and career ==
Thiệp was born in Yên Hồ ward, Đức Thọ district, Hà Tĩnh province, with seven other siblings. His mother was in bad health making her unable to make income, and his father died when Thiệp was in fourth grade. To alleviate the financial situation, Thiệp frequented Vinh for summer break work. After graduating high school, he enrolled in Sofia University in Bulgaria, initially intending to graduate in geodesy, but he changed his discipline to physics and refined to nuclear physics in his second year in university. He cited Tzvetan Bonchev, a Bulgarian professor in nuclear physics, to be his inspiration for pursuing the discipline.

After graduating with a Master of Science in 1977, Thiệp was invited to be an assistant at the Sofia University's physics department. One year later, he returned to Vietnam and was offered a position in the Nuclear Physics Department, Vietnam Institute of Physics. In this time, Vietnam was under a central planned economy, with multiple U.S. sanctions and in a state of general poverty. To quote from the Dân Trí magazine: "During the late 70s and early 80s, [...], the nuclear physics discipline was forgotten without investment [from the government], and there were no state-level projects or projects for the nuclear field." (Note: Original quote: Vào thời gian cuối năm 70, đầu những năm 80, [...], ngành Vật lý hạt nhân bị quên lãng không được đầu tư, không có công trình, đề tài cấp nhà nước cho lĩnh vực hạt nhân.) The nuclear physics department would later be spun off into the Institute for Nuclear Science and Technology as part of Vietnam Atomic Energy Commission.

== Radiation accident ==
In 1982, the Soviet Union gifted the Institute two experimental microtron particle accelerators that had been used for ten years: a neutron generator and an electron accelerator. They are also the first two particle accelerators operated in Southeast Asia.

On 17 November 1992, Thiệp was employed as the director of the Vietnam National Centre for Scientific Research in Hanoi. During a routine task, he placed his hands into a particle accelerator to adjust a sample of gold ore. This adjustment would usually be done using compressed air, but Thiệp entered the room and adjusted the samples by hand. At the same time, his colleagues, mistakenly believing he had left the room to wash his hands with soap in a sink placed outside the containment room, switched the machine on. Thiệp was exposed to a beam current of 6 μA for between two and four minutes. As a result, he suffered severe tissue necrosis in his hands, requiring specialist treatment in Paris, and ultimately had to have his right hand amputated. Thiệp lost the fourth and fifth fingers on his left hand, which subsequently suffered chronic stiffness and radiation-induced fibrosis. He returned to work at the facility in Hanoi in 1994, after more than 600 days of treatment for acute radiation injuries.

In their report, the IAEA acknowledged the pressures that Vietnamese scientists, working in a developing country, were under. Nevertheless, they recommended better regulation of radiation safety and sweeping recommendations to all irradiation facilities regarding safety systems improvements, including automatic warning signals; emergency cut-out buttons; door interlock systems; a search and lock-up fail-safe system; area radiation monitoring and CCTV to ensure the irradiation room was empty before being switched on.

== Later academic career ==
Thiệp's research centered around the Mössbauer effect and nuclear reaction mechanics. He had held a professorship at Russia's Joint Institute for Nuclear Research.

== See also ==
- List of civilian radiation accidents
