= Goiânia accident =

1987 radioactive contamination incident in Brazil

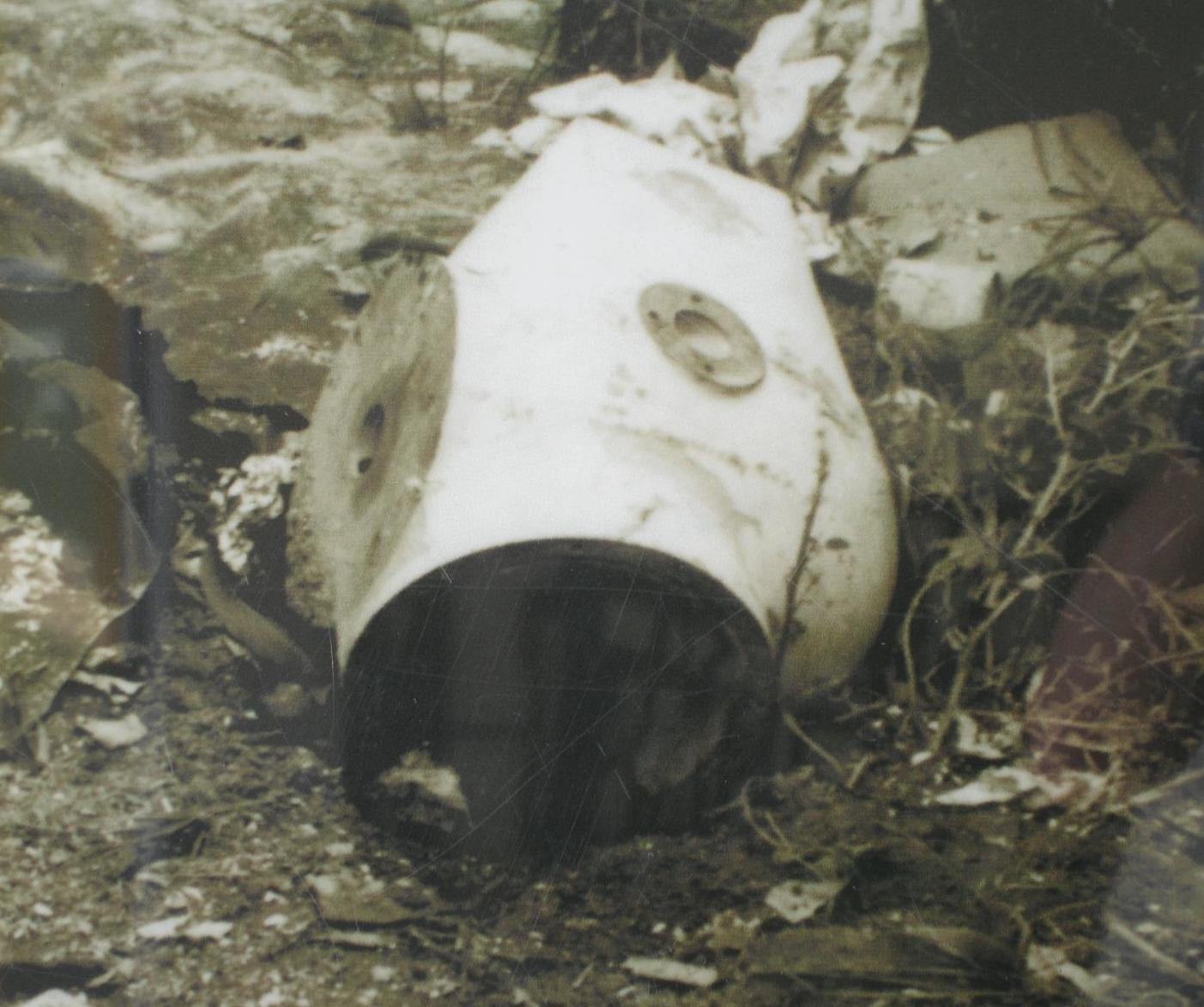
- A photograph of the radioactive source involved in the 1987 accident.
- Native name: Césio 137 Goiânia
- Date: September 13, 1987; 39 years ago
- Location: Goiânia, Goiás, Brazil; 16°40′29″S 49°15′51″W
- Type: Radiation accident
- Cause: Radiation source left unsecured by authorities
- Participants: Maria Gabriela Ferreira; Devair Alves Ferreira; and other relatives
- Outcome: INES Level 5 (accident with wider consequences)
- Deaths: 4
- Injuries: 249 contaminated
- Website: goias.gov.br/saude/cesio-137-goiania/

A typical teletherapy radiation capsule is composed of the following: 1. a sealed outer protective casing (usually lead), 2. a retaining ring, and; 3. a teletherapy "source" (diameter in this diagram is 30 mm), composed in turn of; 4. two nested stainless steel canisters welded to; 5. two stainless steel lids surrounding; 6. a protective internal shield (usually uranium metal or a tungsten alloy), and; 7. a cylinder of radioactive source material (caesium-137 in the Goiânia incident, but usually cobalt-60)

The Goiânia accident (Brazilian Portuguese: [ɡo(j)ˈjɐniɐ]), also known locally as the caesium-137 accident/caesium-137 Goiânia, was a radioactive contamination accident that occurred on September 13, 1987, in Goiânia, Goiás, Brazil, after an unsecured radiotherapy source, inside a lead-and-steel medical device, was found by scavenger thieves at an abandoned hospital site in the city. The thieves, and then workers at the scrapyard owned by Devair Ferreira, who bought the device from the thieves, used tools to open the device and expose the caesium-137 crystals (specifically a caesium chloride salt). Ferreira brought the exposed caesium-137 crystals to his home, sharing them with his family and neighbours; the caesium-137 crystals were subsequently handled by many people, resulting in four deaths – two of Ferreira's family members and two of his scrapyard employees. About 112,000 people were examined for radioactive contamination and 249 of them were found to have been contaminated.

In the consequent cleanup operation, topsoil had to be removed from several sites, and several houses were demolished. All the objects from within those houses, including personal possessions, were seized and incinerated. Time magazine has identified the accident as one of the world's "worst nuclear disasters" and the International Atomic Energy Agency (IAEA) called it "one of the world's worst radiological incidents".

== Source ==
The radiation source in the Goiânia accident was a small capsule containing about 93 grams (3.3 oz) of highly radioactive caesium chloride (a caesium salt) made with the radioactive isotope caesium-137, and encased in a shielding canister made of lead and steel. The source was positioned in a container of the wheel type, where the wheel turns inside the casing to move the source between the storage and irradiation positions.

A wheel type radiotherapy device which has a long collimator to focus the radiation into a narrow beam. The caesium chloride radioactive source is the blue rectangle, and gamma rays are represented by the beam emerging from the aperture.

Comparison of radioactivities
Goiânia source	(TBq)	
1971	74	
1987	50	.9
Recovered	44	
Unrecovered (c. 1987)	7	
Unrecovered (c. 2016)	3	.5
Smoke detector	0	.000000037

The activity of the source was 74 terabecquerels (2,000 Ci) in 1971. The International Atomic Energy Agency (IAEA) describes the container as an "international standard capsule". It was 51 mm (2.0 in) in diameter and 48 mm (1.9 in) long. The specific activity of the active solid was about 814 TBq/kg (9,980 Ci/lb) of caesium-137, an isotope whose half life is 30 years. The dose rate at one meter from the source was 4.56 grays (456 rad) per hour – enough to receive the median lethal dose of 4 Gy (400 rad) in less than an hour. While the serial number of the device was unknown, hindering the ability to verify its identity, the device was thought to have been made in the U.S. at Oak Ridge National Laboratory as a radiation source for radiation therapy at the Goiânia hospital.

The IAEA states that the source contained 50.9 TBq (1,375 Ci) when it was taken and that about 44 TBq (1,200 Ci) of contamination had been recovered during the cleanup operation. This means that 7 TBq (190 Ci) remained in the environment; it would have decayed to about 3.5 TBq (95 Ci) by 2016.

== Events ==
The Instituto Goiano de Radioterapia (IGR), a private radiotherapy institute in Goiânia, was one kilometre (0.6 mi) northwest of Praça Cívica, the administrative center of the city. In 1985, IGR moved to new premises, but left behind a caesium-137-based radiotherapy unit purchased in 1977. In 1986, the fate of the abandoned site was disputed in the Court of Goiás between IGR and the Society of Saint Vincent de Paul, then owner of the premises. On September 11, 1986, during those court hearings, the Court of Goiás was informed of the abandoned radioactive material in the building.

Four months before the theft, on May 4, 1987, Saura Taniguti, then director of the Social Security Institute for Civil Servants in the State of Goiás Instituto de Previdência e Assistência do Estado de Goiás (IPASGO), called the police to prevent one of the owners of IGR, Carlos Figueiredo Bezerril, from removing various items that had been left behind. IPASGO owned the land the abandoned facility stood on, and Figueiredo then warned the president of IPASGO, Lício Teixeira Borges, that the radioactive material was at the site, and that IPASGO would now be responsible "for what would happen with the cesium bomb". The Court of Goiás posted a security guard to protect the site. Meanwhile, the owners of IGR had written several letters to Brazil's National Nuclear Energy Commission (Comissão Nacional de Energia Nuclear; CNEN), warning them about the danger of keeping a teletherapy unit at an abandoned site, and stating IGR could not remove the equipment as a court order prevented them from doing so.

=== Theft of the source ===
On September 13, 1987, the guard tasked with protecting the site did not show up for work. Roberto dos Santos Alves and Wagner Mota Pereira illegally entered the partially demolished and crumbling IGR site. They partially disassembled the teletherapy unit and placed the source assembly in a wheelbarrow to later take to Roberto's home. They thought they might get some scrap value for the unit. They began dismantling the equipment. That same evening, they both began to vomit due to radiation sickness. The following day, Pereira began to experience diarrhea and dizziness, and his left hand began to swell. On September 15, Pereira visited a local clinic, where he was diagnosed with a foodborne illness; he was told to return home and rest. He later developed a burn on his hand in the same size and shape as the aperture, and he underwent partial amputation of several fingers. Roberto, however, continued with his efforts to dismantle the equipment and eventually freed the cesium capsule from its protective rotating head. His prolonged exposure to the radioactive material led to his right forearm becoming ulcerated, requiring amputation on October 14.

=== Interaction with cesium ===
On September 16, Roberto punctured the cesium capsule's aperture window with a screwdriver, allowing him to see a deep blue light coming from the tiny opening he had created. He inserted the screwdriver and successfully scooped out some of the glowing substance. Thinking it was perhaps a type of gunpowder, he tried to light it, but the powder would not ignite.

The exact mechanism by which the blue light was generated was not known at the time the IAEA report of the incident was written, though it was thought to be either ionized air glow, fluorescence, or Cherenkov radiation associated with the absorption of moisture by the source; a similar blue light was observed in 1988 at Oak Ridge National Laboratory in the United States during the disencapsulation of a caesium-137 source.

On September 18, Roberto sold the items to a nearby scrapyard. That night, Devair Alves Ferreira, the owner of the scrapyard, noticed the blue glow from the punctured capsule. Thinking the capsule's contents were valuable or supernatural, he immediately brought it into his house. Over the next three days, he invited friends and family to view the strange glowing powder.

On September 21, at the scrapyard, one of Ferreira's friends (identified as "EF1" in the IAEA report) freed several rice-sized grains of the glowing material from the capsule using a screwdriver. Ferreira began to share some of them with various friends and family members. That same day, his wife, 37-year-old Maria Gabriela Ferreira, began to fall ill. On September 25, 1987, Devair Ferreira sold the scrap metal to a third scrapyard.

The day before the sale to the third scrapyard, on September 24, Ivo, Devair's brother, successfully scraped some additional dust out of the source and took it to his house a short distance away. He spread some of it on the concrete floor. His six-year-old daughter, Leide das Neves Ferreira, later ate an egg while sitting on the floor. She was also fascinated by the powder's blue glow, applying it to her body and showing it off to her mother. The egg was also exposed to dust from the powder; Leide absorbed 1.0 GBq (27 mCi) and received a total dose of 6.0 Gy (600 rad), a fatal dose for which medical intervention was ineffective. Leide's mother, Lurdes Ferreira, also got sick from the radiation.

Maria Gabriela Ferreira had been the first to notice that many people around her had become severely ill at the same time. On September 28, 1987 – fifteen days after the item was found – she reclaimed the materials from the rival scrapyard and transported them to a hospital.

In the morning of September 29, a visiting medical physicist used a scintillation counter to confirm the presence of radioactivity and persuaded the authorities to take immediate action. The city, state, and national governments were all aware of the incident by the end of the day.

== Health outcomes ==
News of the radiation incident was broadcast on local, national, and international media. Within days, nearly 130,000 people in Goiânia flooded local hospitals, concerned that they might have been exposed. Through the use of Geiger counters, 249 were found to be contaminated, some with radioactive residue still on their skin. Eventually, twenty people showed signs of radiation sickness and required treatment.

=== Fatalities ===
Ages in years are given, with dosages listed in grays (Gy). For reference, the LD_{1}, LD_{50} and LD_{99} are 2.5, 5 and 8 Gy (250, 500 and 800 rad), respectively.

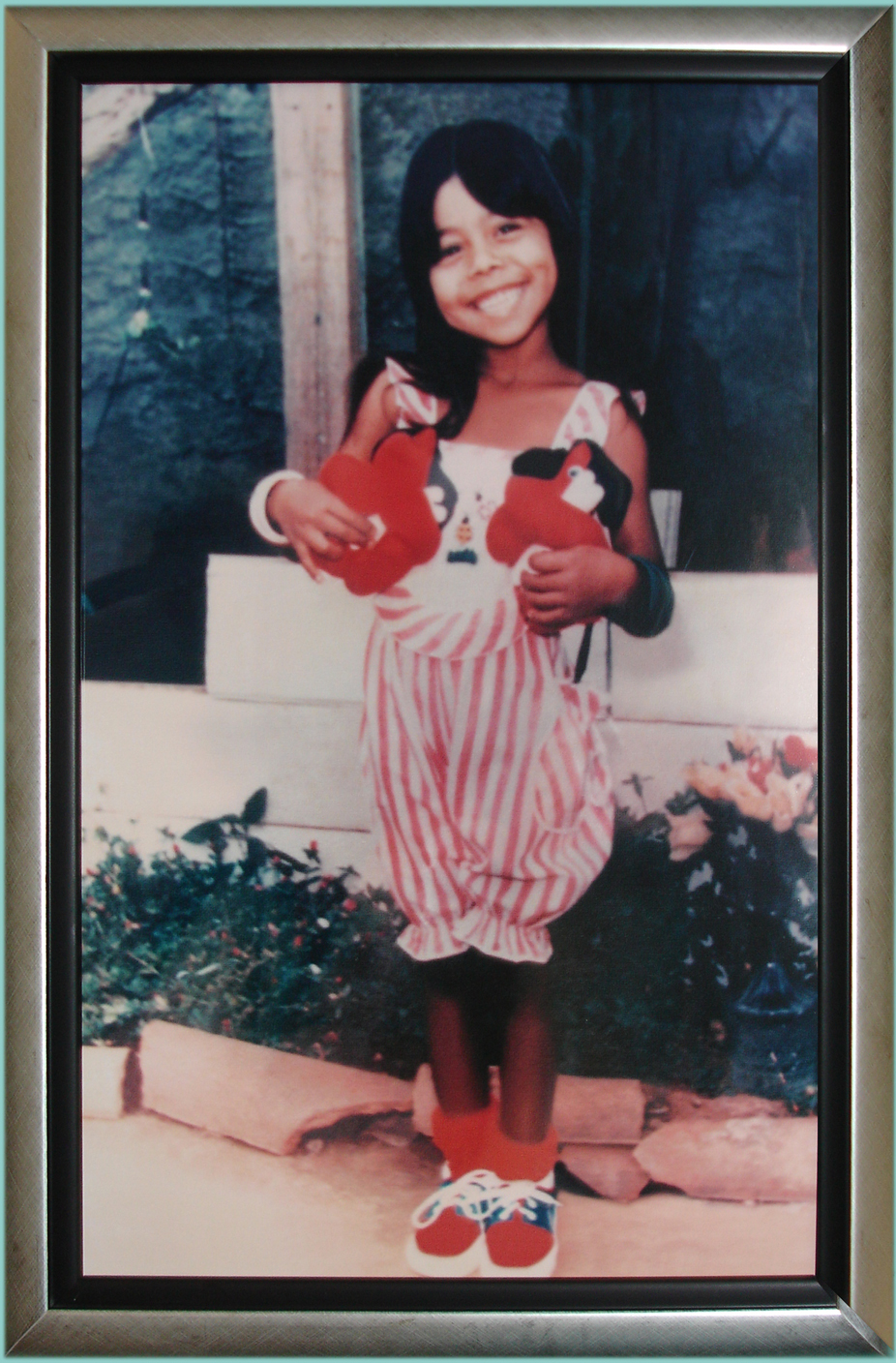
- Leide das Neves Ferreira
  Leide das Neves Ferreira, aged 6 (6.0 Gy (600 rad)), was the daughter of Ivo Ferreira. She became sick after eating an egg contaminated with caesium-137. When an international team arrived to treat her, she was discovered confined to an isolated room in the hospital because the staff were afraid to go near her. She gradually experienced swelling in the upper body, hair loss, kidney and lung damage, and internal bleeding. She died on October 23, 1987, of "septicemia and generalized infection" at the Marcilio Dias Navy Hospital, in Rio de Janeiro. She was buried in a common cemetery in Goiânia, in a special fiberglass coffin lined with lead to prevent the spread of radiation. Despite these measures, news of her impending burial caused a riot of more than 2,000 people in the cemetery on the day of her burial due to fear and disinformation about the bodies possibly contaminating the area. Rioters tried to prevent her burial by using stones and bricks to block the cemetery roadway. She was buried despite the protestors' interference.
- Maria Gabriela Ferreira, a 37-year-old woman (5.7 Gy (570 rad)), was the wife of scrapyard owner Devair Ferreira and who turned the material over to the authorities. She became sick about three days after coming into contact with the substance. Her condition worsened, and she developed hair loss and internal bleeding, especially of the limbs, eyes, and digestive tract. She suffered mental confusion, diarrhea, and acute renal insufficiency before dying of "septicemia and generalized infection", on October 23, 1987, the same day as her niece, about a month after exposure.
- Israel Batista dos Santos, aged 22 (4.5 Gy (450 rad)), was an employee of Devair Ferreira who worked on the radioactive source primarily to extract the lead. He developed serious respiratory and lymphatic complications, was eventually admitted to the hospital, and died six days later on October 27, 1987.
- Admilson Alves de Souza, aged 18 (5.3 Gy (530 rad)), was also an employee of Devair Ferreira who worked on the radioactive source. He developed lung damage, internal bleeding, and heart damage, and died October 28, 1987.

Devair Ferreira survived despite receiving 7 Gy (700 rad) of radiation. He died in 1994 of cirrhosis aggravated by depression and binge drinking. Ivo Ferreira died of emphysema in 2003.

The outcomes for the 46 most contaminated people are shown in the bar chart below. Several people survived high doses of radiation. This is thought in some cases to be because the dose was fractionated. Given time, the body's repair mechanisms will reverse cell damage caused by radiation. If the dose is spread over a long time period, these mechanisms can mitigate the effects of radiation poisoning.

Barchart showing the outcome for the 46 most contaminated people for whom a dose estimate has been made. The people are divided into seven groups according to dose.

Afterwards, about 112,000 people were examined for radioactive contamination; 249 were found to have significant levels of radioactive material in or on their body. Of this group, 129 people had internal contamination. The majority of the internally contaminated people only suffered small doses (<50 mSv (5.0 rem), corresponding to less than about 1 in 200 excess risk of developing cancer later in life). A thousand people were identified as having suffered a dose which was greater than one year of background radiation; it is thought that 97% of these people had a dose of between 10 and 200 mSv (1.0 and 20.0 rem) (between 1 in 1,000 and 1 in 50 excess risk of developing cancer as a result).

In 2007, the Oswaldo Cruz Foundation determined that the rate of caesium-137 related diseases are the same in Goiânia accident survivors as they are in the population at large. Nevertheless, compensation is still distributed to survivors, who suffer radiation-related prejudices in everyday life. The mortality from pancreatic cancer in the Central-Western region of Brasil, which includes Goiás with Goiânia, is higher than in other areas of the country.

== Legal matters ==
In addition to a public civil action for damages to the environment that was brought in September 1995 by the Federal Public Prosecution Service (Department of Justice), together with the State of Goiás’s Public Prosecution Service, before the 8th Federal Court of Goiânia, legal proceedings were also brought against the Federal Union; the National Nuclear Energy Commission; the State of Goiás (through its Health Department); the Social Security Institute for Civil Servants in the State of Goiás – IPASGO, which at the time of the accident was the private owner of the land where the IGR was located; the four medical doctors who owned IGR; and the clinic’s physicist, who was also the supervisor.

On March 17, 2000, the 8th Federal Court of Goiás ordered the defendants to pay compensation of R$1.3 million (near US$750,000) to the Defence of the Diffused Rights Fund, a federal fund for the compensation of damage to the environment, consumers, property and rights of artistic, historic, or cultural value and other collective rights. In his sentence, the judge excluded the state of Goiás and the Federal Union from the payment of compensation. The CNEN was ordered to pay compensation of R$1 million, to guarantee medical and psychological treatment for the direct and indirect victims of the accident and their descendants down to the third generation, to provide transportation to medical exams for the most serious victims, and was responsible for the medical follow-up for the people of Abadia de Goiás city. The Social Security Institute for Civil Servants in the State of Goiás, IPASGO, was ordered to pay a fine of R$100,000, plus interest as of 13 September 1987, the date of removal of the caesium-137 capsule.

As the accidents occurred before the promulgation of the Federal Constitution of 1988 and because the substance was acquired by the clinic and not by the individual owners, the court could not declare the owners of IGR liable. However, one of the owners was fined R$100,000 because he was found liable for the abandoned state of the IGR building where the caesium source was kept, including the removal of gates, windows, timberwork and the roof in May 1987. The clinic's physicist was also fined R$100,000 because he was the technician responsible for the control of the medical manipulation of the radiological device.

Although the two thieves were not included as defendants in the public civil suit, the judgement of the court found them directly responsible for the accident. Since they were unaware of the seriousness of their actions in removing the caesium source from its location, and since they lacked knowledge of the dangers of the radiological device, they did not have the necessary criminal intent to be prosecuted. Moreover, there was no danger sign erected in the abandoned clinic in order to ward off intruders, thus redirecting liability to IGR.

== Cleanup ==
Topsoil had to be removed from several sites, and several houses were demolished. All the objects from within those houses were removed and examined. Those that were found to be free of radioactivity were wrapped in plastic bags, while those that were contaminated were either decontaminated or disposed of as waste. In industry, the choice between decontaminating or disposing objects is based on only the economic value of the object and the ease of decontamination. In this case, the IAEA recognized that to reduce the psychological impact of the event, greater effort should have been taken to clean up items of personal value, such as jewelry and photographs. It is not clear from the IAEA report to what degree this was practiced.

After the houses were emptied, vacuum cleaners were used to remove dust, and plumbing was examined for radioactivity. Painted surfaces could be scraped, while floors were treated with acid and Prussian blue mixtures. Roofs were vacuumed and hosed, but two houses had to have their roofs removed. The waste from the cleanup was moved out of the city to a remote place for storage. Aeroradiometric operations were undertaken by low-altitude survey, which was carried out over Goiânia. The radiometric equipment and materials available at the IRD were quickly transported and mounted on a Eurocopter AS350 Écureuil helicopter provided by the police of the state of Goiás.

Potassium alum dissolved in hydrochloric acid was used on clay, concrete, soil, and roofs. Caesium has a high affinity for many clays. Organic solvents, followed by potassium alum dissolved in hydrochloric acid, were used to treat waxed/greased floors and tables. Sodium hydroxide solutions, also followed by dissolved potassium alum, were used to treat synthetic floors, machines and typewriters.

Prussian blue was used to internally decontaminate many people, although by the time it was applied, much of the radioactive material had already migrated from the bloodstream to muscle tissue, greatly hampering its effectiveness. Urine from victims was treated with ion-exchange resin to compact the waste for ease of storage.

The cleanup operation was much harder for this event than it could have been because the source was opened and the active material was water-soluble. A sealed source need only be picked up, placed in a lead container, and transported to the radioactive waste storage. In the recovery of lost sources, the IAEA recommends careful planning and using a crane or other device to place shielding (such as a pallet of bricks or a concrete block) near the source to protect recovery workers.

=== Contamination locations ===
Locations around Goiânia
1 Instituto Goiano de Radioterapia
2 Roberto dos Santos' house
3 Devair Ferreira's scrapyard
4 Ivo Ferreira's house/Junkyard II
5 Junkyard III

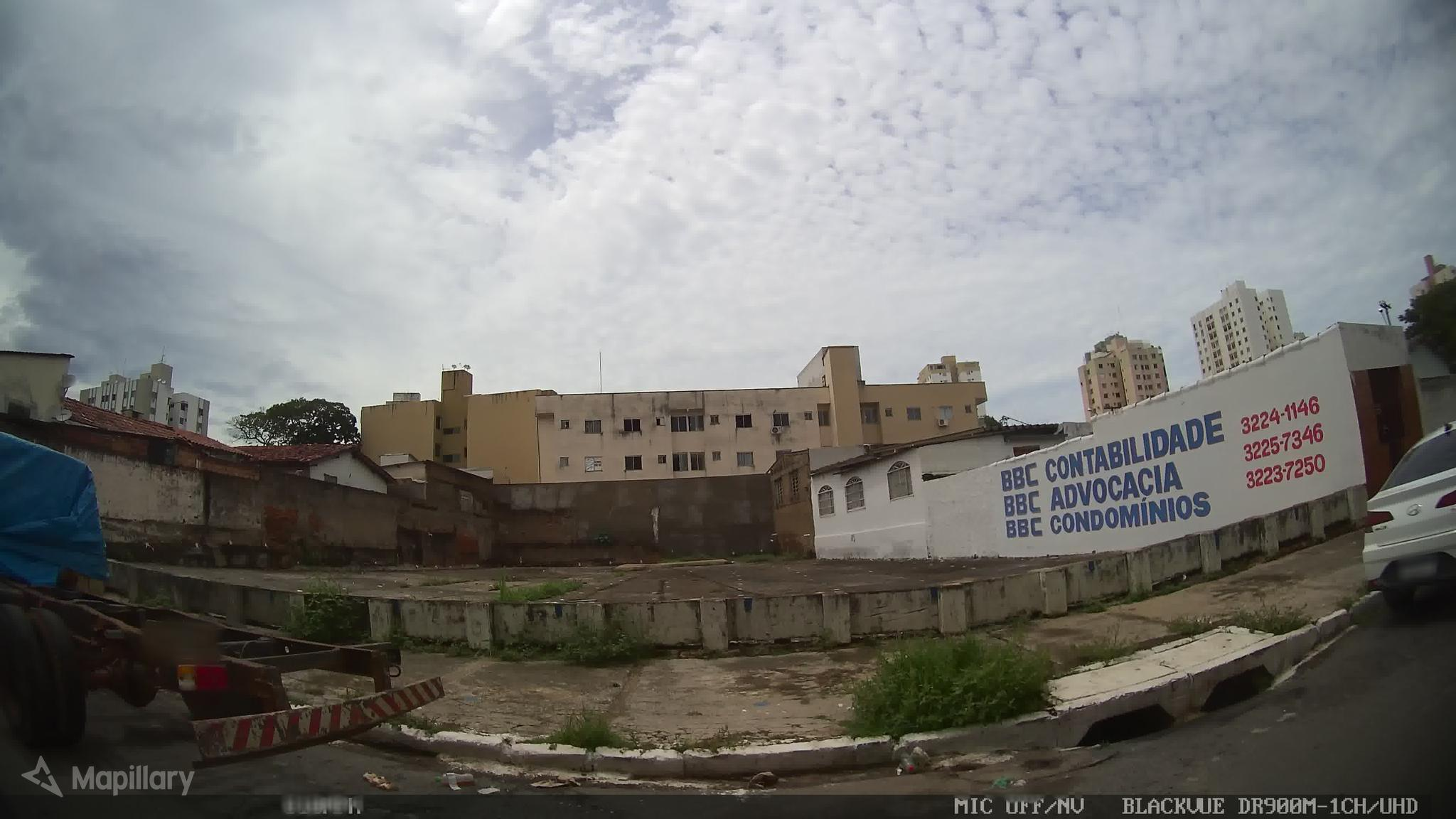
The site of Devair Ferreira's scrapyard in 2020

The Goiânia accident spread significant radioactive contamination throughout the Aeroporto, Central, and Ferroviários districts. Even after the cleanup, 7 TBq (190 Ci) of radioactivity remained unaccounted for.

Some of the key contamination sites:

- Goiânia's Instituto Goiano de Radioterapia (IGR) (16°40′29″S 49°15′51″W), despite being the origin of the radiation source, suffered no actual exposure or breach of radioactive contents. IGR moved its clinic to another location in the city, with the previous site having been replaced around 2000 with the modernized Centro de Convenções de Goiânia (Goiânia Convention Center).
- Roberto dos Santos's house (16°40′07″S 49°15′48″W) on Rua 57. The radioactive source was here for about six days, and it was partially broken into.
- Devair Ferreira's scrapyard (16°40′02″S 49°15′59″W), on Rua 15A ("Junkyard I") in the Aeroporto section of the city, had possession of the items for seven days. The caesium container was entirely dismantled, spreading significant contamination. Extreme radiation levels of up to 1.5 Sv·h^{−1} were found by investigators in the middle of the scrapyard.
- Ivo Ferreira's house (16°39′50″S 49°16′09″W) ("Junkyard II"), at 1F Rua 6. Some of the contamination was spread about the house, fatally poisoning Leide das Neves Ferreira and Maria Gabriela Ferreira. The adjacent junkyard scavenged the remainder of parts from the IGR facility. The premises were heavily contaminated, with radiation dose rates up to 2 Sv·h^{−1}.
- "Junkyard III" (16°40′09″S 49°16′48″W). This junkyard had possession of the items for three days until they were sent away.
- Vigilância Sanitária (16°40′30″S 49°16′23″W). Here, the substance was quarantined, and an official cleanup response began.

Other contamination was also found in or on:

- Three buses
- Forty-two houses
- Fourteen cars
- Five pigs
- Fifty thousand rolls of toilet paper

== Legacy ==
The original teletherapy capsule was taken by the Brazilian Army, and the empty capsule has since been on display at the Escola de Instrução Especializada ("Specialized Instruction School") in Realengo, Rio de Janeiro as a memento to those who participated in the decontamination of the area.

In 1991, a group of researchers collected blood samples from highly exposed survivors of the incident. Subsequent analysis resulted in the publication of numerous scientific articles.

Many of the radioactive substances were cleared after testing. Banned products from Goiânia created a public outcry, citing unjust discrimination.

The state government of Goiás established the Fundação Leide das Neves Ferreira in February 1988, both to study the extent of contamination of the population as a result of the incident and to render aid to those affected.

=== In popular culture ===
The 1990 film, Césio 137 – O Pesadelo de Goiânia (Caesium-137 – The Nightmare of Goiânia), is a Brazilian dramatisation of the incident by Roberto Pires. It won several awards at the 1990 Festival de Brasília. On his 1992 album Amor y Control, Rubén Blades dedicated the song "El Cilindro" to the Goiânia tragedy. Cesium Fallout, a 2024 Hong Kong disaster thriller film, was partially inspired by the Goiânia accident. In Liliana Colanzi's short story collection You Glow In The Dark, the eponymous short story is a fictionalized account of the accident. On March 18, 2026, Gustavo Lipsztein's Netflix original series Radioactive Emergency was released, telling the story of this case.

== See also ==
- List of civilian radiation accidents
- Ciudad Juárez cobalt-60 contamination incident, similar disaster in Mexico
- Radioactive scrap metal
- List of orphan source incidents
- 1990 Clinic of Zaragoza radiotherapy accident
- 1962 Mexico City radiation accident
- Nuclear and radiation accidents and incidents
- Samut Prakan radiation accident
- Therac-25
