= Kramatorsk radiological accident =

Radiation incident in Ukraine, 1980–1989

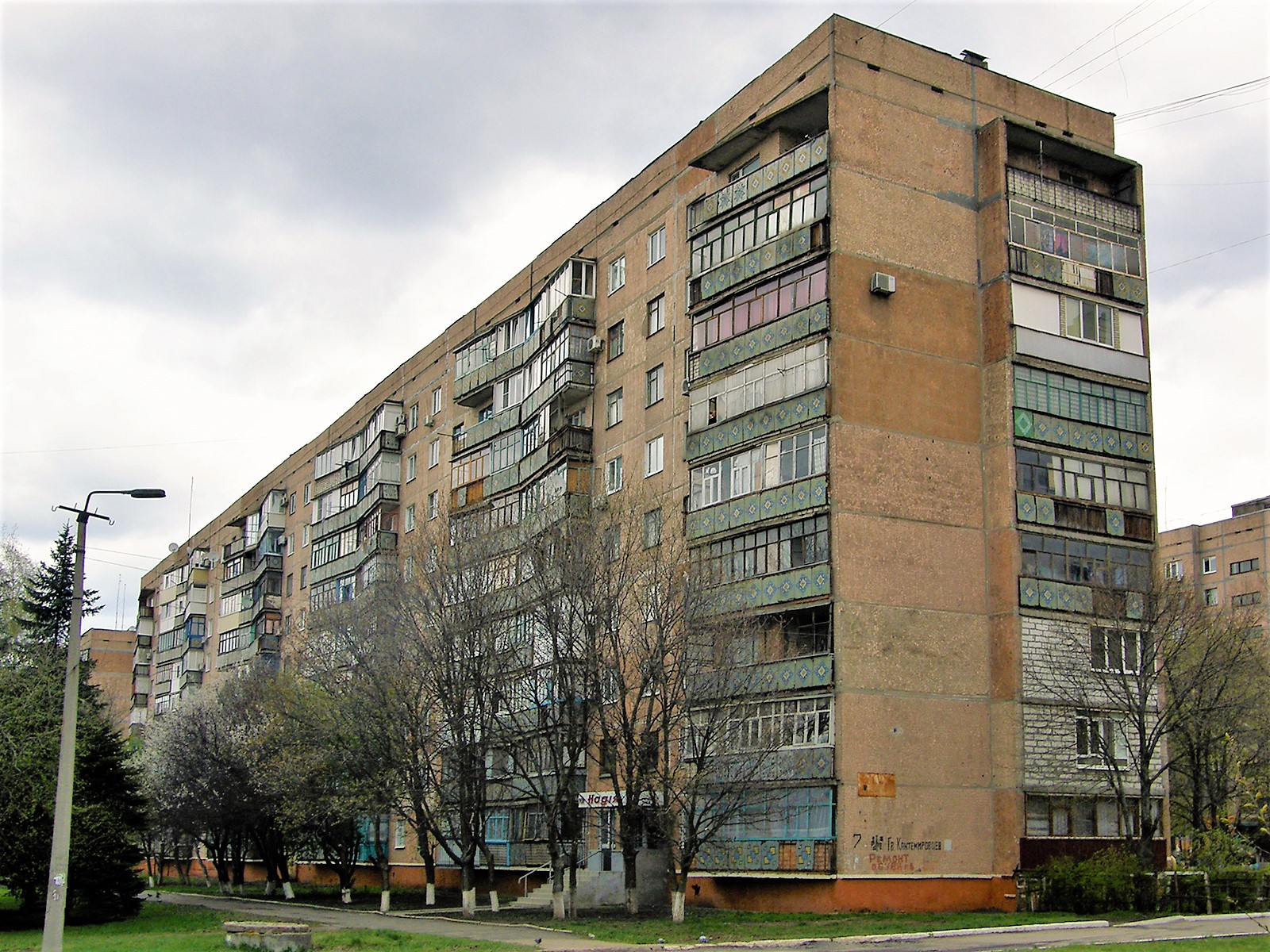
- Building 7
- Duration: 1980–1989
- Location: Kramatorsk, Ukrainian SSR; 48°44′03″N 37°36′22″E
- Type: Radiation accident
- Cause: Loss of radioactive material
- Deaths: 6

The Kramatorsk radiological accident was a radiation accident that happened in Kramatorsk, Donetsk Oblast, in eastern Ukrainian SSR from 1980 to 1989. A small capsule containing highly radioactive caesium-137 was found inside the concrete wall of an apartment building, with a surface gamma radiation exposure dose rate of 1800 R/year. The capsule was detected only after residents requested that the level of radiation in the apartment be measured by a health physicist.

== History ==
The capsule was originally part of a radiation level gauge and was lost in the Karansky quarry in the late 1970s. The search for the capsule was unsuccessful and ended after a week. The gravel from the quarry was used in construction. The caesium capsule ended up in the concrete panel, which was installed as a wall between apartments 85 and 52 in building 7 on Gvardeytsev-Kantemirovtsev Street (now Marii Pryimachenko Street).

Over nine years, two families lived in apartment 85. A child's bed was positioned right next to the wall containing the capsule. The apartment was fully occupied in 1980. A year later, an 18-year-old young woman living there suddenly died. In 1982, her 16-year-old brother died, followed by their mother. Despite all residents succumbing to leukemia, the flat did not garner much public attention. Doctors, unable to identify the root cause of the illness, attributed the diagnosis to poor heredity. A new family moved into the apartment, and their son also died of leukemia. His father initiated a thorough investigation, which led to the discovery of the vial in the wall in 1989.

Part of the wall was removed and sent to the Institute for Nuclear Research, where the caesium capsule was removed, identified by serial number and disposed of. In total, 6 residents of the building have died and 17 more have received varying doses of radiation.

== See also ==
- List of orphan source incidents
- List of civilian radiation accidents
