= 2025 radioactive shrimp recall =

Food recall in the United States

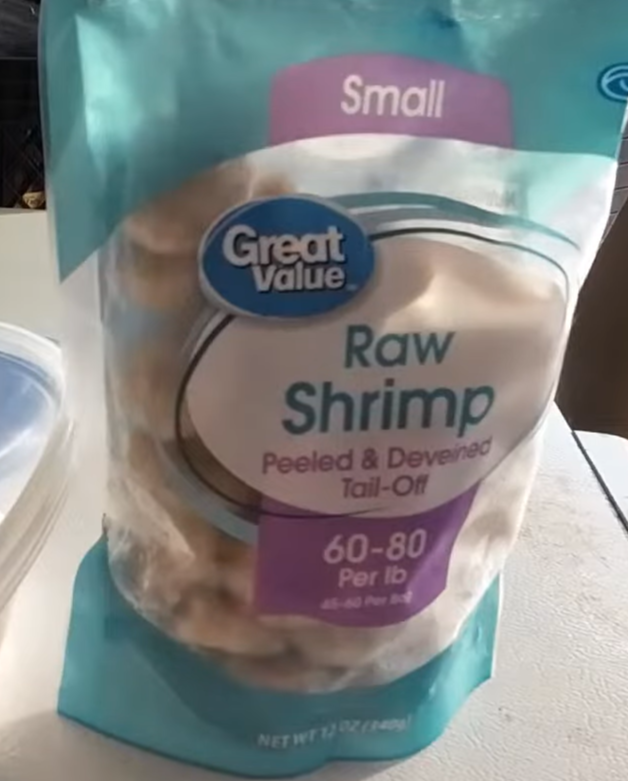
A bag of Walmart Great Value shrimp, one of the brands subject to the recall

On 18 August 2025, the United States Food and Drug Administration (FDA) issued a statement that shipments of shrimp from Indonesia produced by PT BMS (Bahari Makmur Sejati) had received radioactive contamination from caesium-137. This initial report indicated that none of the contaminated shrimp had entered the marketplace; an update, on 19 August, stated that three batches sold under the Walmart store brand Great Value had been distributed after a lack of prior detection; ‍ in all, shipments of contaminated shrimp had arrived at ports Los Angeles, Houston, Miami, and Savannah. The contaminated shrimp were recalled by Walmart.‍ Further recalls were issued on August 21 by Southwind Foods of Carson, California and Beaver Street Fisheries of Jacksonville, Florida.

The contaminated shrimp had been processed by Indonesian seafood supplier Bahari Makmur Sejati (more familiarly known as BMS), all of whose shipping containers were promptly placed on the FDA's Import Alert 99-51 list (or "Hot List")‍ and summarily denied entry to the U.S.‍

The FDA's threshold for mandatory action is 1200 becquerels per kilogram (Bq/kg). The contaminated shrimp was at 68 Bq/kg, 17 times lower than this threshold (nonetheless 100 times above background levels) and on par with the radiation naturally emitted by the potassium in bananas which is 140 Bq/kg. Health physicists from the American Nuclear Society noted that these levels of radioactivity in frozen shrimp were abnormal and warranted further investigation. While one-time exposure would not present an acute hazard to consumers, chronic exposure could damage DNA, thus elevating cancer risk.

The Jakarta Post and VOI.id reported on August 20–21 that BMS had halted all production and shipment of shrimp to the U.S. pending investigations by the Nuclear Energy Regulatory Agency (BAPETEN), the National Research and Innovation Agency (BRIN), and the Ministry of Marine Affairs and Fisheries (KKP).

On August 25, FDA recall was expanded beyond Walmart's Great Value brand to five others—Arctic Shores, Sand Bar, Best Yet, First Street, and Great American—covering 12 different products. The shrimp impacted had been distributed between July 17 and August 8, included both raw and cooked frozen shrimp, and had been distributed to Alabama, Arizona, California, Massachusetts, Minnesota, Pennsylvania, Utah, Virginia, and Washington. The recalls in total covered 18 states.

Two further recalls were issued on August 27 and August 28 by AquaStar (USA) Corp of Seattle, Washington. The first covered 18,000 bags of 2 pounds (0.91 kg) net of Kroger Mercado Cooked Medium Peeled Tail-Off Shrimp. The second recall covered 26,460 packages of refrigerated cocktail shrimp 6 ounces (170 g), the first recall specifically of cocktail shrimp, covering 27 states.

Another recall was issued in December 2025 by Direct Source Seafood LLC in Bellevue, Washington.

== Investigation ==
The Indonesian government followed up on the report, with a joint team membered by the Ministry of Environment, Ministry of Trade, National Energy Regulatory Agency, National Research and Innovation Agency, Mobile Brigade Corps, and local government officials conducting searches in Cikande Modern Industrial Area and discovering the presence of Cs-137 radiation. The government has declared a special incident for Cs-137 radionuclide radiation in the Cikande Modern Industrial Area. The radioactive substance has contaminated nine people. On October 3, Indonesian authorities announced that the radioactive material originated from a metal scrapyard in the Modern Cikande industrial park near Jakarta, and that the nine contaminated local people and workers have undergone special medical treatment.

The scrapyard factory is considered to be the epicenter of the contamination; the number of contaminated areas throughout the industrial park, which was initially thought to be six, was later determined to be ten (two of which have been decontaminated). Investigators ascertained that the caesium-137 entered the domestic supply chain through a stainless steel smelter operated by PT Peter Metal Technology in Cikande, Banten province; it has been declared the local source of contamination and shut down. Given that the scrapyard and the seafood processing plant were less than 2 km apart, the working hypothesis is that the cesium-137 was airborne, or carried by the wind.

On 14 October 2025, the Ministry of Environment and Ministry of Trade issued a temporary ban of importation of iron and metal scraps into Indonesia.

A ring of iron thieves also played a role in dispersing the radioactive contamination. On 10 December 2025, police uncovered a group that had been stealing iron scraps from PT Peter Metal Technology iron waste storage over several months. Although only about 200 kg of scraps were stolen, compared with 1136 kg of contaminated materials overall in storage, the radioactive contamination from the stolen iron was inadvertently dispersed by the ring through their clandestine network, so far reaching Serang Regency.
