= Radioactive source =

Radionuclide emitting ionizing radiation

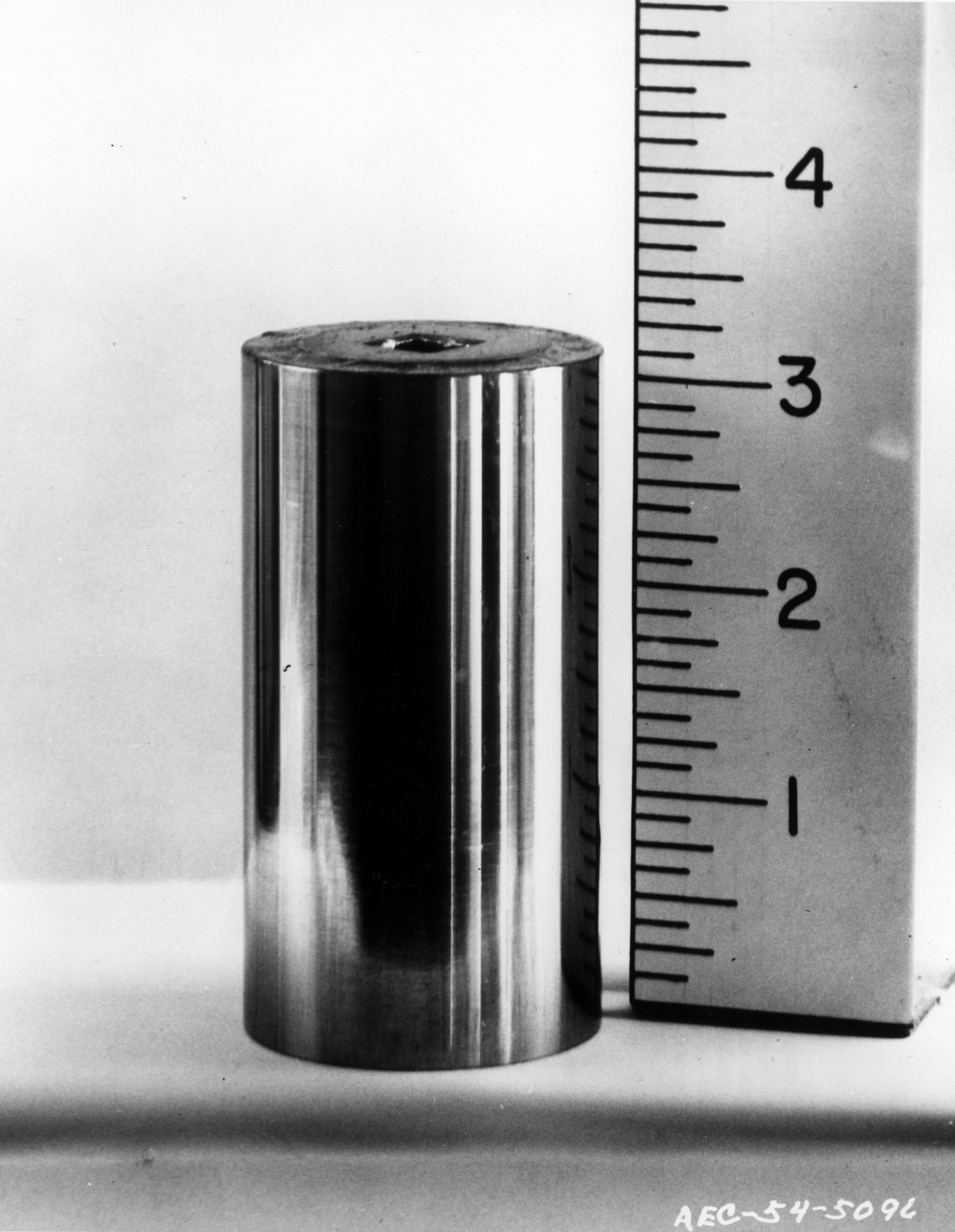
A new sealed caesium-137 radiation source as it appears in its final state

A radioactive source is a known quantity of a radionuclide which emits ionizing radiation, typically one or more of the radiation types gamma rays, alpha particles, beta particles, and neutron radiation.

Sources can be used for irradiation, where the radiation performs a significant ionising function on a target material, or as a radiation metrology source, which is used for the calibration of radiometric process and radiation protection instrumentation. They are also used for industrial process measurements, such as thickness gauging in the paper and steel industries. Sources can be sealed in a container (highly penetrating radiation) or deposited on a surface (weakly penetrating radiation), or they can be in a fluid.

As an irradiation source they are used in medicine for radiation therapy and in industry for such as industrial radiography, food irradiation, sterilization, vermin disinfestation, and irradiation crosslinking of PVC.

Radionuclides are chosen according to the type and character of the radiation they emit, intensity of emission, and the half-life of their decay. Common source radionuclides include cobalt-60, iridium-192, and strontium-90. The SI measurement quantity of source activity is the Becquerel, though the historical unit Curies is still in partial use, such as in the US, despite their NIST strongly advising the use of the SI unit. The SI unit for health purposes is mandatory in the EU.

An irradiation source typically lasts for between 5 and 15 years before its activity drops below useful levels. However sources with long half-life radionuclides when used as calibration sources can be used for much longer.

A cutaway diagram of a radioactive source used for teletherapy (external beam radiotherapy): A key to the lettering can be found on the file page

== Sealed sources ==
Many radioactive sources are sealed, meaning they are permanently either completely contained in a capsule or firmly bonded solid to a surface. Capsules are usually made of stainless steel, titanium, platinum or another inert metal. The use of sealed sources removes almost all risk of dispersion of radioactive material into the environment due to mishandling, but the container is not intended to attenuate radiation, so further shielding is required for radiation protection. Sealed sources are used in almost all applications where the source does not need to be chemically or physically included in a liquid or gas.

=== Categorisation of sealed sources ===
2007 ISO radioactivity danger symbol intended for IAEA Category 1, 2 and 3 sources defined as dangerous sources capable of causing death or serious injury.

Sealed sources are categorised by the IAEA according to their activity in relation to a minimum dangerous source (where a dangerous source is one that could cause significant injury to humans). The ratio used is A/D, where A is the activity of the source and D is the minimum dangerous activity.

Category	A/D
1	≥1000
2	10–1000
3	1–10
4	0.01–1
5	<0.01

Note that sources with sufficiently low radioactive output (such as those used in Smoke detectors) as to not cause harm to humans are not categorised.

== Calibration sources ==
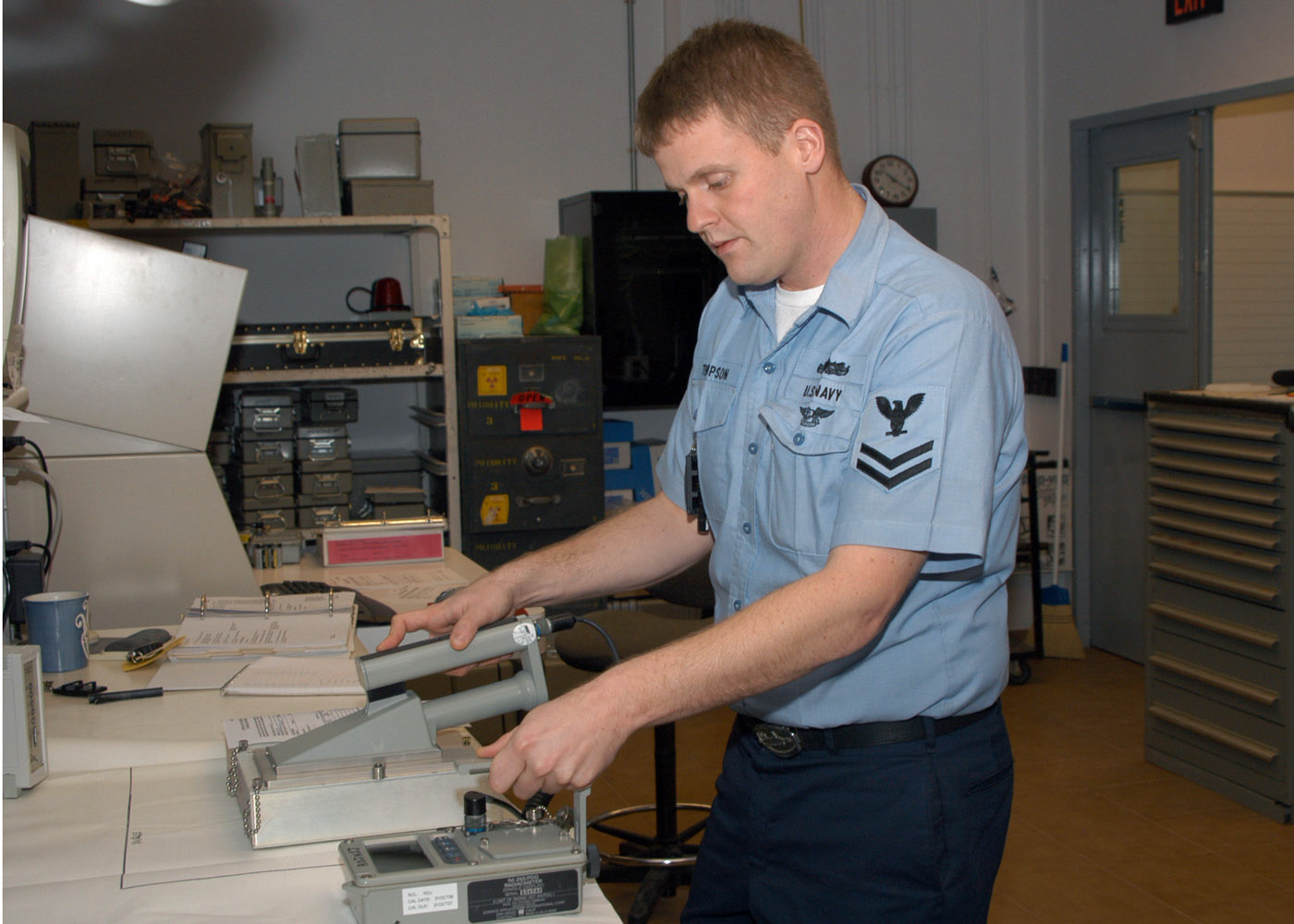
Hand-held large area alpha scintillation probe under calibration using a plate source

Calibration sources are used primarily for the calibration of radiometric instrumentation, which is used on process monitoring or in radiological protection.

Capsule sources, where the radiation effectively emits from a point, are used for beta, gamma and X-ray instrument calibration. High level sources are normally used in a calibration cell: a room with thick walls to protect the operator and the provision of remote operation of the source exposure.

The plate source is in common use for the calibration of radioactive contamination instruments. This has a known amount of radioactive material fixed to its surface, such as an alpha and/or beta emitter, to allow the calibration of large area radiation detectors used for contamination surveys and personnel monitoring. Such measurements are typically counts per unit time received by the detector, such as counts per minute or counts per second.

Unlike the capsule source, the plate source emitting material must be on the surface to prevent attenuation by a container or self-shielding due to the material itself. This is particularly important with alpha particles which are easily stopped by a small mass. The Bragg curve shows the attenuation effect in free air.

== Unsealed sources ==
Unsealed sources are sources that are not in a permanently sealed container, and are used extensively for medical purposes. They are used when the source needs to be dissolved in a liquid for injection into a patient or ingestion by the patient. Unsealed sources are also used in industry in a similar manner for leak detection as a radioactive tracer.

== Disposal ==
Disposal of expired radioactive sources presents similar challenges to the disposal of other nuclear waste, although to a lesser degree. Spent low level sources will sometimes be sufficiently inactive that they are suitable for disposal via normal waste disposal methods – usually landfill. Other disposal methods are similar to those for higher-level radioactive waste, using various depths of borehole depending on the activity of the waste.

A notorious incident of neglect in disposing of a high level source was the Goiânia accident, which resulted in several fatalities. The Tammiku radioactive material theft involved the accidental theft of caesium-137 material in Tammiku, Estonia, in 1994.

== See also ==
- Common beta emitters
- Commonly used gamma-emitting isotopes
- Geiger counter
- Ionizing radiation
- Neutron source
- Orphan source
