= Theft of radioactive material in Tammiku =

1994 theft in Estonia

The theft of radioactive material in Tammiku, often called the Tammiku nuclear accident, took place in 1994. Three brothers in Tammiku, Männiku, Saku Parish (Harju County), Estonia, who were scrap metal scavengers, entered a fenced area in the woods and broke into a small shed that was seemingly abandoned (after having had no success with entering a larger building inside the area), with stairs leading to an underground hall. The brothers did not know that the buildings were nuclear waste storage facilities (although there were signs at the gate, they did not see them because they had climbed over the fence elsewhere). One of the brothers, Ivan, suffered a crush injury when a drum fell onto him. The brothers placed some pieces of metal into their pockets and went home, planning to return later. Ivan placed a metal cylinder in his pocket, not knowing that it was a strong caesium-137 radioactive source that was released from a container broken by the falling drum. He received a 4,000 rad whole-body dose and died 12 days later. Only after Ivan's family's dog died, and Ivan's stepson showed radiation burn on his hands (as a result of briefly touching the cylinder), was the cause of Ivan's death identified. The delay in information was due to the brothers' reluctance to admitting to the break-in.

The storage facility was decommissioned in 2008 and 55TBq worth of radioactive waste was sorted and disposed of.
