= Orphan source =

Radioactive device under improper control

An orphan source is a self-contained radioactive source that is no longer under regulatory control.

It is defined by the United States Nuclear Regulatory Commission as:

...a sealed source of radioactive material contained in a small volume—but not radioactively contaminated soils and bulk metals—in any one or more of the following conditions:

- In an uncontrolled condition that requires removal to protect public health and safety from a radiological threat
- Controlled or uncontrolled, but for which a responsible party cannot be readily identified
- Controlled, but the material's continued security cannot be assured. If held by a licensee, the licensee has few or no options for, or is incapable of providing for, the safe disposition of the material
- In the possession of a person, not licensed to possess the material, who did not seek to possess the material
- In the possession of a State radiological protection program for the sole purpose of mitigating a radiological threat because the orphan source is in one of the conditions described in one of the first four bullets and for which the State does not have a means to provide for the material's appropriate disposition

Most known orphan sources were, generally, small radioactive sources produced legitimately under governmental regulation. They were used for a variety of purposes including gauges, static eliminators, and various devices used in nuclear medicine. These sources were then "abandoned, lost, misplaced or stolen" and so no longer subject to proper regulation. Sources that were never under regulatory control can still be considered orphan sources.

They can be accidentally incorporated into scrap metal, contaminating the resulting recycled metal. This necessitates expensive cleanup measures, and can expose manufacturing workers or the users of the metal products to harmful doses of ionizing radiation.

== See also ==
- List of orphan source incidents
- Radioactive scrap metal
