= Lists of nuclear disasters and radioactive incidents =

These are lists of nuclear disasters and radioactive incidents.

== Main lists ==
- List of articles about the Three Mile Island accident
- List of Chernobyl-related articles
- List of civilian nuclear accidents
- List of civilian radiation accidents
- List of crimes involving radioactive substances
- List of criticality accidents and incidents
- List of military nuclear accidents
- List of nuclear and radiation accidents and incidents
- List of nuclear and radiation accidents by death toll
- List of nuclear meltdown accidents
- List of orphan source incidents
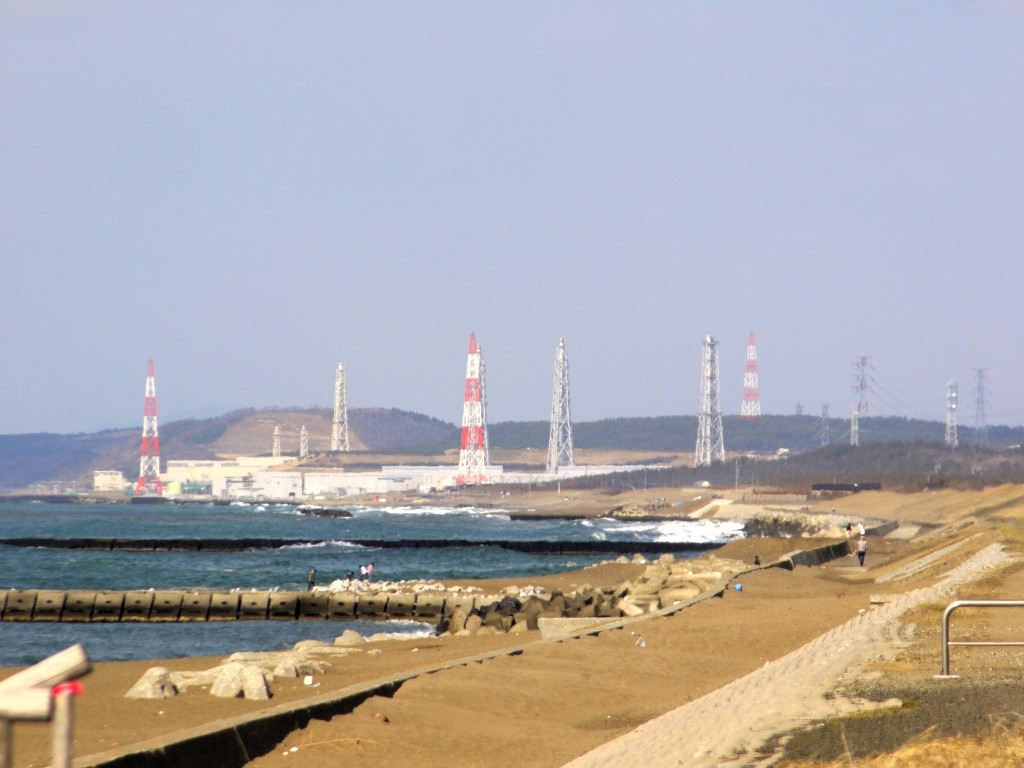
The Kashiwazaki-Kariwa Nuclear Power Plant, in Niigata Prefecture, Japan, the world's largest single nuclear power station, was completely shut down for 21 months following the 2007 Chūetsu offshore earthquake.

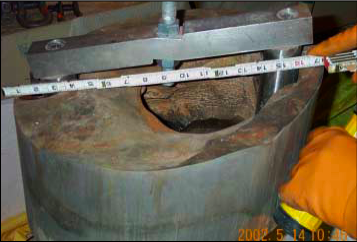
Erosion of the 150-millimetre-thick (5.9 in) carbon steel reactor head at Davis-Besse Nuclear Power Plant, in Oak Harbor, Ohio, USA, in 2002, caused by a persistent leak of borated water

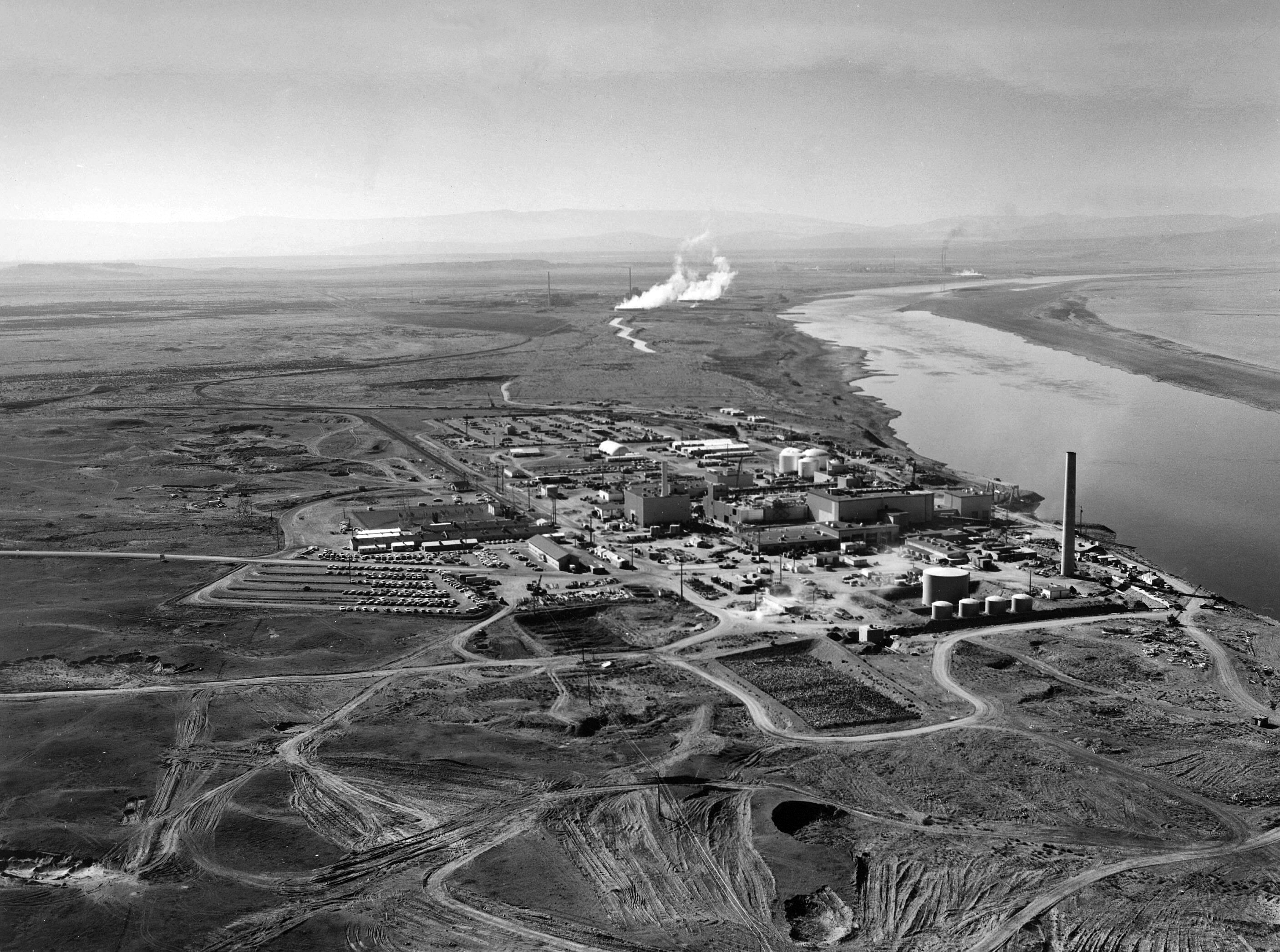
The Hanford Site, in Benton County, Washington, USA, represents two-thirds of America's high-level radioactive waste by volume. Nuclear reactors line the riverbank at the Hanford Site along the Columbia River in January 1960.

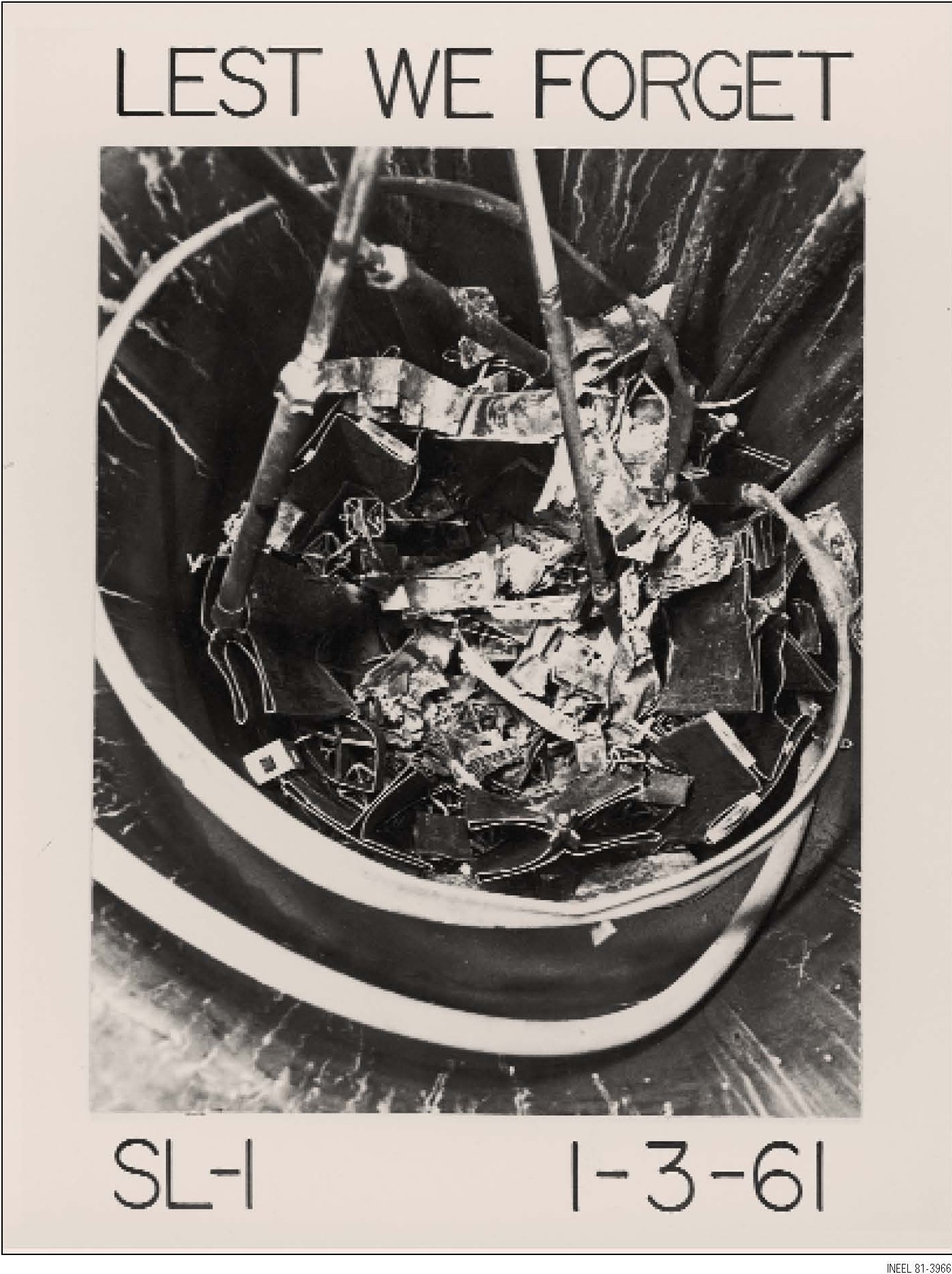
This image of the core from the SL-1 disaster, Idaho Falls, Idaho, United States, served as a reminder of the necessity for proper reactor practice and safeguards.

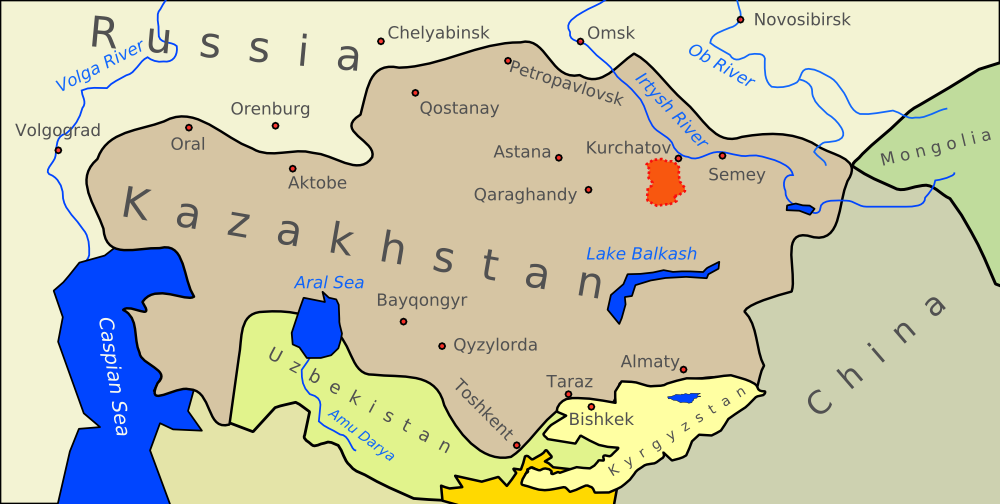
The 18,000 km^{2} expanse of the Semipalatinsk Test Site (indicated in red), in present-day Kazakhstan, covers an area the size of Wales.

== Lists by country ==
- List of nuclear power accidents by country
- Nuclear reactor accidents in the United States
- List of nuclear and radiation fatalities by country

== Individual disasters, incidents and sites ==
- 2024 Nuclear incident at Khabarovsk, Russia
- 2022–2023 Monticello Nuclear Generating Plant leak
- 2019 Radiation release during explosion and fire at Russian nuclear missile test site
- 2017 Airborne radioactivity increase in Europe in autumn 2017
- 2011 Fukushima Daiichi nuclear disaster
- 2010 Mayapuri radiological accident
- 2007 Radioactive leakage in C.N. Ascó I (Ascó - Tarragona)
- 2004 Mihama Nuclear Power Plant accident
- 2001 Instituto Oncologico Nacional radiotherapy accident
- 2000 Samut Prakan radiation accident, Thailand.
- 1999 and 1997 Tokaimura nuclear accidents
- 1996 San Juan de Dios radiotherapy accident
- 1994 Theft of radioactive material in Tammiku, Estonia.
- 1993 Tomsk-7 accident at the Reprocessing Complex in Seversk, Russia, when a tank exploded while being cleaned with nitric acid. The explosion released a cloud of radioactive gas (INES level 4).
- 1990 Clinic of Zaragoza radiotherapy accident
- 1987 Goiânia accident
- 1986 Chernobyl disaster and Effects of the Chernobyl disaster
- 1985 Explosion during refuelling of the K-431 (formerly K-31) submarine
- 1984 Radiation accident in Morocco
- 1982 Lost radiation source in Baku, Azerbaijan, USSR.
- 1980 Houston radiotherapy accident.
- 1979 Church Rock uranium mill spill
- 1979 Three Mile Island accident and Three Mile Island accident health effects
- 1974–1976 Columbus radiotherapy accident.
- 1969 Lucens reactor
- 1968 Thule B-52 crash
- 1966 Palomares B-52 crash
- 1964 SNAP 9a satellite releases plutonium over the planet earth, an estimated 630 TBq or 2100 person-Sv of radiation was released.
- 1962 Thor missile launch failures during nuclear weapons testing at Johnston Atoll under Operation Fishbowl
- 1962 Radiation accident in Mexico City
- 1961 SL-1 nuclear meltdown
- 1961 K-19 nuclear accident
- 1959 SRE partial nuclear meltdown at Santa Susana Field Laboratory
- 1958 Mailuu-Suu tailings dam failure
- 1957 Kyshtym disaster
- 1957 Windscale fire
- 1957 Operation Plumbbob
- 1954 Totskoye nuclear exercise
- 1946–1954 Bikini Atoll nuclear tests
- Hanford Site
- Rocky Flats Plant, see also radioactive contamination from the Rocky Flats Plant
- Techa River
- Pollution of Lake Karachay
- 1945 and 1946 Demon core
- 1942 Leipzig L-IV experiment accident

== See also ==
- Atomic spies
- International Nuclear Event Scale
- List of books about nuclear issues
- List of environmental disasters
- List of films about nuclear issues
- List of hydroelectric power station failures
- List of industrial disasters
- Nuclear fallout
- Nuclear safety and security
- Nuclear terrorism
- United States military nuclear incident terminology
- Vulnerability of nuclear facilities to attack
