= Three Mile =

Three Mile or Threemile may refer to:

== Communities ==
- Three Mile, North Carolina
- Three Mile, West Virginia
- Three Mile, Port Moresby, Papua New Guinea
- Three Mile, Lae, Papua New Guinea

== Bodies of water ==
- Three Mile Bay, New York
- Threemile Creek (disambiguation)
- Three Mile Lake
- Three Mile River

== See also ==
- Three Mile Island (disambiguation)
- Three-mile limit
