= Threemile Creek =

Threemile Creek may refer to:

- Threemile Creek (Licking River), a stream in Kentucky
- Threemile Creek (Minnesota River), a stream in Minnesota
- Threemile Creek (Missouri), a stream in Missouri
- Threemile Creek (Hocking River), in Ohio
- Threemile Creek (Roaring Fork River tributary), in Colorado

== See also ==
- Three Mile River
