= A-1 (nuclear reactor) =

First industrial-scale reactor in the Soviet Union

A
- Workers on top of the reactor, late 1950s. Its design is very similar to the RBMK.
- Reactor concept: Plutonium production reactor
- Designed by: Laboratory No. 2
- Operational: 19 June 1948 to 16 June 1987
- Status: Shut down
- Location: Mayak Production Association, Chelyabinsk-40, Soviet Union

Main parameters of the reactor core
- Fuel (fissile material): Natural uranium
- Fuel state: Solid (rods)
- Neutron energy spectrum: Slow
- Primary control method: Control rods
- Primary moderator: Nuclear graphite (block), coolant water
- Primary coolant: Water from Techa river

Reactor usage
- Primary use: Plutonium production
- Power (thermal): 100 MW (initial), 900 MW (final upgrade)
- Criticality (date): 10 June 1948
- Operator/owner: Mayak Production Association
- Remarks: First industrial-scale reactor in USSR, first water-cooled reactor in USSR, second reactor in USSR

The A-1 was the first nuclear reactor in the Soviet Union for the industrial production of weapons-grade plutonium, built and operated at the Mayak Production Association from 1948 for the Soviet atomic bomb project. It was affectionately named "Annushka" by project scientists, was the second nuclear reactor to go critical in the Soviet Union, and the first geographically situated in Asia.

== Design ==
It was designed as a light water-cooled, graphite-moderated reactor (LWGR), with an initial power level of 100 MWt (megawatts thermal). Its design and purpose were similar to the B Reactor, the first industrial-scale US plutonium production reactor. The Soviet nuclear weapons program had extensive espionage on the Manhattan Project, and program chief Lavrentiy Beria pushed for direct replication of Manhattan designs at every step. Due to concerns that the Mayak facility was in range of US Boeing B-29 Superfortress bombers, the reactor was to be sheltered underground in a pit, similar to the first Soviet nuclear reactor, the F-1, constructed at Laboratory No. 2 in Moscow. Unlike the above-ground American B Reactor, which used horizontal loading of uranium and irradiation slugs, Soviet scientists successfully pushed for a vertical design. This became the forerunner of the RBMK design.

== Construction ==
The uranium and graphite material used in the reactor underwent purity testing at the F-1 nuclear reactor. It was composed of 1050 tons of graphite, and 120 to 130 tons of natural uranium.

== Operation ==
Lead Soviet nuclear physicist Igor Kurchatov brought the reactor to criticality on 8 June 1948. It began operation on 19 June 1948. Plutonium metal was first separated from its spent fuel on 16 April 1949. It was the only source of plutonium for the first Soviet nuclear test, RDS-1, on 29 August 1949.

It was the second-ever nuclear reactor in the USSR (after the F-1 in Moscow), and represented many of their firsts, including first large-scale plutonium production and first water-cooled.

During its operation, it suffered many issues leading to shutdown and repairs. These included corrosion of the aluminium channel liners and fuel element cladding, swelling and breakage of uranium rods, fuel melting, rods fusing into the graphite, and leakage of cooling water into the graphite core.

Two partial meltdowns occurred in June and July of 1948, the former resulting in a graphite fire. Following a series of leaks and fuel damage in late 1948, beginning in January 1949 a full reassembly was attempted to salvage the reactor. Uranium slugs were removed after five months of operation, at temperatures over 100 °C (212 °F). Many were partially melted, fused to the graphite in carbides, or otherwise corroded. It was not known at the time they also gave off radiation in the megacurie range. There was also exposure to gasseous fission products. Workers handled irradiated slugs, sometimes directly, and suffered injuries including burns, amputations, and radiation sickness.

Kurchatov himself received hazardous doses during the cleanup of the 1949 meltdown, which very likely contributed to his health decline in 1950, stroke in 1954, and death in 1960 at age 57.

== See also ==
- B Reactor, first US plutonium production reactor
- Windscale Piles, first UK plutonium production reactor
- Marcoule Nuclear Site, site of first French plutonium production reactor
- Dimona Nuclear Centre, site of first Israeli plutonium production reactor
- CIRUS reactor, first Indian plutonium production reactor
- Khushab Nuclear Complex, site of first Pakistani plutonium production reactor
- Jiuquan reactor, first Chinese plutonium production reactor
- Nyongbyon Nuclear Scientific Research Center, site of first North Korean plutonium production reactor
