= City 40 (film) =

- Directed by: Samira Goetschel
- Written by: Samira Goetschel; Monique Zavistovski
- Produced by: André Singer (Executive producer); Samira Goetschel
- Cinematography: Anonymous
- Edited by: Monique Zavistovski; Joe Botana
- Music by: Michael A. Levine
- Distributed by: Cinephil
- Release date: September 1, 2016
- Running time: 73 minutes
- Country: United States
- Language: Russian

City 40 (Russian: Сороковка) is a 2016 Russian documentary film directed by Samira Goetschel about the closed city of Ozyorsk, near the location of the nuclear Kyshtym disaster, Soviet Union. Footage is provided from hidden cameras and Russian archival footage as well as modern-day interviews, which are spoken in Russian and subtitled in English. In 2017, it was nominated for an Emmy Award in the News & Documentary category.

== Synopsis ==
The film documents the lives of the people in Ozyorsk, Chelyabinsk Oblast, also known as Ozersk, code named "City 40". The town is near Mayak, the birthplace of the Soviet Union's nuclear weapons program as well as the location of the Kyshtym disaster. The town was modeled after plans stolen from the United States, which created its own secret atomic cities. The people living in Ozersk believe that they are saving the world. They are trapped by barbed wire fences and heavily guarded gates, but have better-than-average access to groceries and other supplies that citizens outside of the city do not have.

Mayak stores an estimated fifty tons of weapons-grade plutonium and 38 tons of enriched uranium. As of 2016, the factory produces radioactive isotopes for medical and space use, but its other activities are guarded by the state. Radioactive waste from the factory was insecurely dumped into the nearby Lake Irtyash and Techa River, creating some of the most polluted water bodies in the world, with isotopes reaching as far as the Arctic Ocean. Neither Mayak nor Ozersk existed on state maps at all until after the fall of the Soviet Union.

The documentary interviews residents and other people. Nadezhda Kutepova, an attorney and civil rights activist in Ozersk whose beliefs changed from thinking the town was doing its patriotic duty for the state to being confronted with the ecological damage being caused by radioactive waste, defends its citizens who have been affected by the radiation. Vladimir Kuznetsov, a member of the Russian Atomic Energy Corporation, gives details of how the factory is heavily guarded. Journalists, scientists and other interviewees, some with their faces obscured, tell of life in the factory and the town and how their families have suffered from early deaths due to the unsecure handling of the radioactive substances.

An epilogue tells of how Kutepova and her family later fled the area and were granted asylum in France after being persecuted by the Russian government for her activities. It also lists a number of secret cities, past and present, around the world.

== Production ==
The Frontline Club hosted a screening and question and answer session with Goetschel and journalist Luke Harding on 14 June 2016. Goetschel said she and her crew were in a sanitarium outside of Ozersk and tried to make contact with residents in order to gain access. The film crew and the residents that spoke with them were under risk of death. Goetschel said "They have been told they would be killed. But then there was a click that made them decide to talk. The most important thing was that they knew they were risking their lives. They were thinking we are dying anyway and they trusted me for whatever reason."
