= Airborne radioactivity increase in Europe in autumn 2017 =

2017 unusual increase of airborne radioactivity in Europe

Airborne radioactivity was detected in Europe during autumn 2017, starting from the last days of September. The source is widely suspected to be in Russia; the Russian government, however, denies that any nuclear mishaps occurred that could have caused the radiation spike. The radioactive isotope detected was ruthenium-106, and was detected across Europe. It was found to be in small quantities (from microbecquerels to a few millibecquerels per cubic metre of air): not significant for the health of the population far away from the source. It is estimated, however, that the radiation released posed a danger to any employees or residents within several kilometers of the currently unknown source.

== Radioactivity detected ==
European monitoring networks declared increased radioactivity levels in Europe (originating from Eastern Europe) in the first days of October:

- the Swiss Federal Office of Public Health (FOPH) reported increase of radioactive particles of ruthenium-106 from 25 September
- The Institute of Radioprotection and Nuclear Safety of France, indicated that the relatively high levels in the beginning of October steadily decreased from 6 October, while no radioactive element was detected after 13 October.

An assessment of the French nuclear safety institute IRSN indicated that while there was no health risk for the vast majority of people in Europe, the radioactive quantity released was significant—estimated from 100 to 300 terabecquerels—which would require an evacuation of people from a radius of several kilometers from the as-yet-unidentified source. The source of the aforementioned 100–300 TBq activity corresponds approximately to 1–3 grams of the ruthenium-106 isotope.

== Possible source ==
The 1940s-1950s era and still most common PUREX separation process for uranium and plutonium from spent nuclear fuel. Variations of the process have and continue to find applications in many facilities such as La Hague in the manufacture of MOX reactor fuel, where reactor-grade plutonium is reused as fuel and likewise in the extraction of weapons grade plutonium, in the legacy B205 facility in Britain and the Mayak facility in Russia.

While the release of the noble gas isotope krypton-85 is routine during nuclear reprocessing, the noble metal ruthenium, which is generated in a fission product yield rate of from 0.39% to 3.103% of every fission of a nucleus of uranium or plutonium respectively, is by contrast generally in metallic form, with a high boiling point of 4,150 °C (7,500 °F) in spent fuel. Owing to the ionizing radiation environment of spent fuel and the entry of oxygen, however, radiolysis reactions can make the more volatile compound ruthenium(VIII) oxide, which has a boiling point of approximately 40 °C (104 °F) and is a strong oxidizer, reacting with virtually any fuel/hydrocarbon. The use of a solution of tributyl phosphate in the hydrocarbons kerosene or dodecane, is frequent – as part of the nuclear reprocessing method known as PUREX. Ru-106 has been accidentally released to the atmosphere through this pathway in the past, such as the UK's B204 reprocessing incident in 1973, where 34 employees were exposed.

With corrosion of the fuel rod-cladding in the MAGNOX-reactor, spent fuel pools (an issue in the British case, due to the selection of magnesium for the coating on the fuel rods), reprocessing needed to occur within a few months at the B205 facility; most other facilities (like the French La Hague) place the spent-fuel in spent fuel pools for about a decade, until the Ru-106, which has a half-life of ~ 1 year, has safely decayed into rhodium Rh-106 and finally the stable palladium Pd-106. All attempts at PUREX to less aged spent-fuel need to take into account the presence of the oxidative and volatile ruthenium(VIII) oxide.

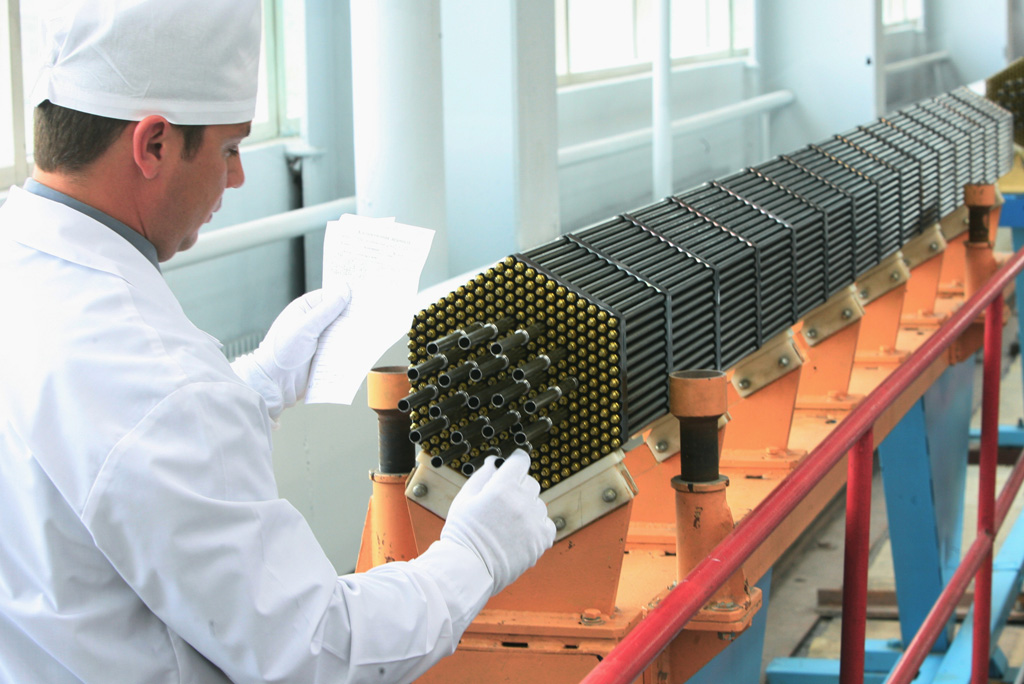
A nuclear fuel rod assembly bundle being inspected before entering a reactor.

Initially there was no indication given for the source of these radioactive particles apart from an October 2017 statement coming from German authorities estimating the source in the east: more than 1,000 kilometres (600 mi) from Germany. A later report from the German Federal Radiation Protection Service ruled in the South of the Urals and other potential locations.

The Federal Service for Hydrometeorology and Environmental Monitoring of Russia (Roshydromet) said that Ru-106 activity in St. Petersburg was at 115.4 μBq/m^{3} from October 2 to 6.

The French Institute of Radioprotection and Nuclear Security (IRSN) ruled out the emissions as coming from a nuclear reactor, estimating that it should have come either from a treatment site or from a center producing radioactive medicine. They estimated the source to be south of the Ural mountains, between the Urals and the Volga river, in Russia or Kazakhstan.

Roshydromet then issued a report describing a rise in beta activity of aerosols and surfaces at all monitoring posts in South Ural from September 25 to October 1, 2017. In two aerosol samples, an increase in Ru-106 activity was detected. On September 26 and 27, Ru-106 decay products were detected in the Republic of Tatarstan. On September 27 and 28, high pollution levels of aerosols and surfaces was detected in Volgograd and Rostov-on-Don. In two aerosol samples from Chelyabinsk Oblast, 986- and 440-fold activity increases were measured, as compared to the preceding month.

The Mayak reprocessing and isotope production plant is widely suspected as the source. Authorities there and at Rosatom, the Russian state company running the nuclear industry, have denied a link.

On 21 November 2017, Russia reversed itself by confirming that a radiation spike was recorded at two monitoring facilities within 100 kilometres (62 mi) of the plant. Russia states the published data is not sufficient to establish the air pollution source and government denies it has had any measurements or admissions of any incident.

Rosatom initially stated that it had not carried out any operations that could have led to the isotope's release into the atmosphere "for many years". In December 2017, however, senior Mayak executive Yuri Morkov admitted that ruthenium-106 is routinely released as part of the plant's processing of spent nuclear fuel. Morkov characterized the amount released as "insignificant" and denied Mayak was the source of the radiation spike.

Domestic investigation within Russia is hampered by the problem that Mayak is in the walled-off closed city of Ozyorsk, which non-resident Russians are barred from visiting without special permission, and by government harassment of nuclear critics. In Russia prominent nuclear critics experience government raids, are accused on state TV of "exploiting the nuclear issue to foment revolution", and risk criminal prosecution on charges of incitement of hatred against nuclear energy employees.

The Russian Academy of Sciences's Nuclear Safety Institute set up an international committee to investigate the incident. The French Institute of Radioprotection and Nuclear Security (IRSN) provided a report to the committee in January 2018. The report concluded that the most likely source of the pollution is a spent fuel treatment facility located in a region between Volga and Ural. A possible reason for the release of radioactivity at Mayak PA might be an unsuccessful attempt to produce cerium-144 for the European scientific project Borexino. Mayak PA had agreed to deliver cerium-144 in fall 2016, but canceled the contract in December 2017. Mayak PA was the only facility capable of producing cerium-144 from "fresh" spent nuclear fuel 2–3 years old. Usually spent fuel is not processed earlier than five years after extraction. The Ru106/Ru103 ratio in analyzed environmental samples during the pollution spread was characteristic of "fresh" spent fuel. While the non-Russian members of the committee accepted the conclusions of IRSN's report, the Russian members maintain that an inspection by Rostechnadzor of the Mayak PA facility in November 2017 showed no anomalies and a rare meteorological event may have transported the ruthenium-106 from somewhere else to the apparent region of origin.

In 2019, a number of European nuclear scientific research groups published "clear evidence" that the leak originated from Southern Urals, where Mayak plant is located. A study published in 2020 investigated the isotopic composition of the released ruthenium and concluded that it had originally been produced in a Russian water-water energetic reactor (VVER). A shipment of nuclear waste from VVERs at Kola Nuclear Power Plant is known to have arrived at Mayak six weeks prior to the estimated release date, as part of the cerium-144 project.

== Timeline of European detection and public notice ==
- the Swiss Federal Office of Public Health (FOPH) reported increase of radioactive particles of ruthenium-106 since 25 September
- The Austrian Ministry of the Environment informed the public on 3 October 2017
- The Norwegian Nuclear Safety Authority (NRPA) also released information on low levels of ruthenium isotope in the atmosphere
- The Greek Atomic Energy Commission (EEAE) informed of increased radiation in the atmosphere in Athens since 27 September

Similar announcements came from other authorities:

- The German Office for Radiation Protection reported increased radioactivity since 29 September
- The Finnish Radiation and Nuclear Safety Authority STUK issued an announcement on 3 October reporting increased radioactivity in samples since 28 September
- The Nuclear Safety Administration of the Republic of Slovenia announced detection of low levels of ruthenium-106 in the atmosphere on 9 October
- The Institute of Radioprotection and Nuclear Safety of France, indicated that the relatively high levels in the beginning of October steadily decreased from 6 October, while no radioactive element was detected after 13 October.
