= Mayak =

Nuclear reprocessing plant in Russia

Coordinates: 55°42′45″N 60°50′53″E

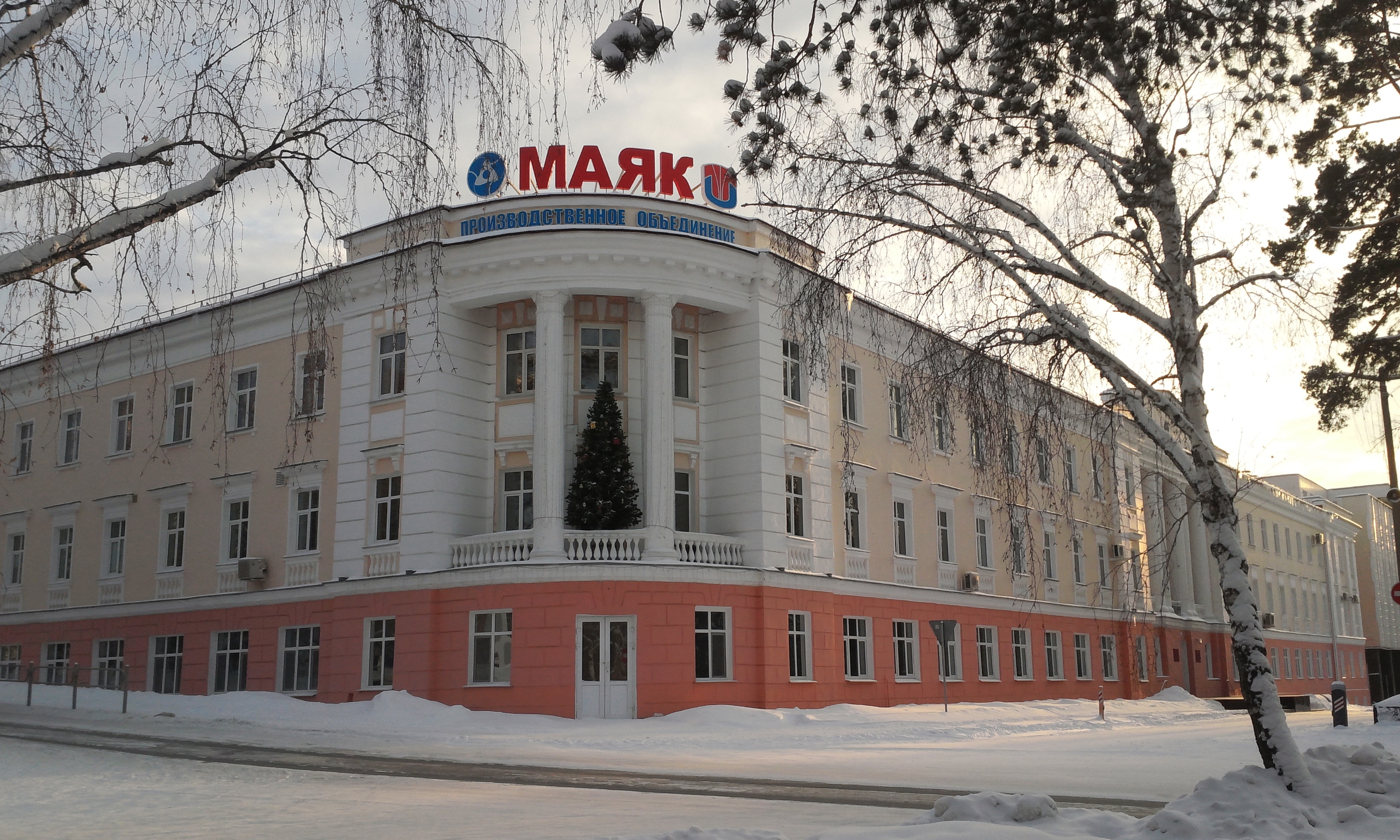
- Mayak headquarters in Ozyorsk
- Type: Federal State Unitary Enterprise
- Industry: Nuclear energy
- Founded: 1948
- Headquarters: Ozyorsk, Chelyabinsk Oblast, Russia
- Revenue: 195,000,000 United States dollar (1994)
- Parent: Rosatom
- Website: po-mayak.ru

The Mayak Production Association (Russian: Производственное объединение «Маяк», Proizvodstvennoye ob′yedineniye "Mayak", from Маяк 'lighthouse') is a nuclear facility near Ozyorsk, Chelyabinsk Oblast, Russia, with production reactors and a reprocessing plant. Its reprocessing capacity, at 400 tonnes of heavy metal (Note: Tonnes of heavy metal, abbreviated as tHM, is a unit of mass used to quantify uranium, plutonium, thorium and mixtures of these elements.) per year, is the second-largest in the world, following the La Hague site in France. It is currently used for military and civilian radioisotope production, and was historically central to the Soviet nuclear weapons program.

Lavrentiy Beria led the Soviet atomic bomb project. He directed the construction of the Mayak plutonium plant in the Southern Urals between 1945 and 1948, in a great hurry and secrecy as part of the Soviet Union's atomic bomb project. The plant had a similar purpose to the Hanford Site of the Manhattan Project. Over 40,000 gulag prisoners and POWs built the factory and the closed nuclear city of Ozyorsk, called at the time by its classified postal code "Chelyabinsk-40". The first reactor, A-1, operated from 1948 and fuelled the first nuclear test RDS-1 in 1949. During the Cold War, 10 nuclear reactors were constructed, with a combined power of 7,333 MWth. Of these, four were used for plutonium production, yielding 31 tons of weapons-grade plutonium, out of the Soviet Union's all-time production of 145 tons. The other six reactors primarily produced tritium for thermonuclear weapons. In 1990, weapons-grade plutonium production was ceased.

As of 2025, Mayak is still active, with two reactors in operation at 1,900 MWth. Today the plant primarily produces tritium for domestic weapons maintenance, and plutonium-238, used by many space programs for radioisotope thermoelectric generators. Many other radioisotopes are commercially sold worldwide, including ^{14}C, ^{60}Co, ^{137}Cs, ^{147}Pm, ^{193}Ir, ^{237}Np, ^{241}Am. Polonium-210 produced at Mayak was reportedly used in the 2006 poisoning of Alexander Litvinenko. It also reprocesses the spent nuclear fuel from civilian reactors, and manages plutonium from decommissioned nuclear weapons. In recent years, proposals that the plant reprocess waste from foreign nuclear reactors have given rise to controversy.

The site has had many radiation accidents and radioactive contamination. In 1949–1951, 76 million m^{3} of toxic chemicals and 3.2 million curies 750 km^{2} (290 sq mi) of radioactive waste were released into the Techa river. In 1957, the Kyshtym disaster occurred at Mayak, releasing 20 million curies in a radioactive cloud across the eastern Urals. It was the worst nuclear accident in history until the Chernobyl disaster, and is still the third most severe. Mayak is also widely suspected to be the source of the ~200 TBq (~5400 curies) airborne radioactivity increase in Europe in autumn 2017. Between the first two accidents, 38,000 people were evacuated. Many other communities remained exposed, suffering long-term effects of radiation poisoning.

== Location ==
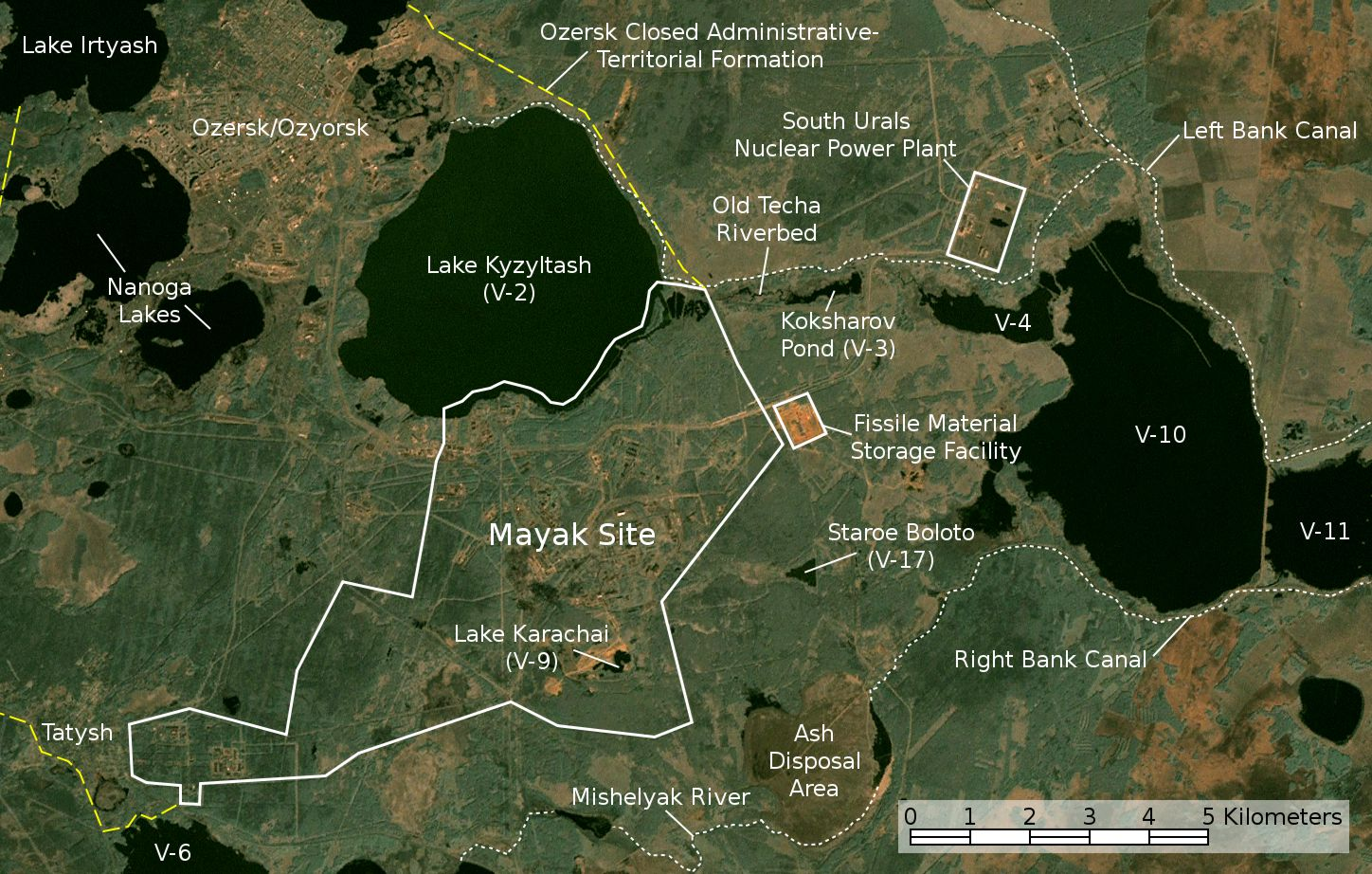
Satellite image/map of the Mayak nuclear facility.

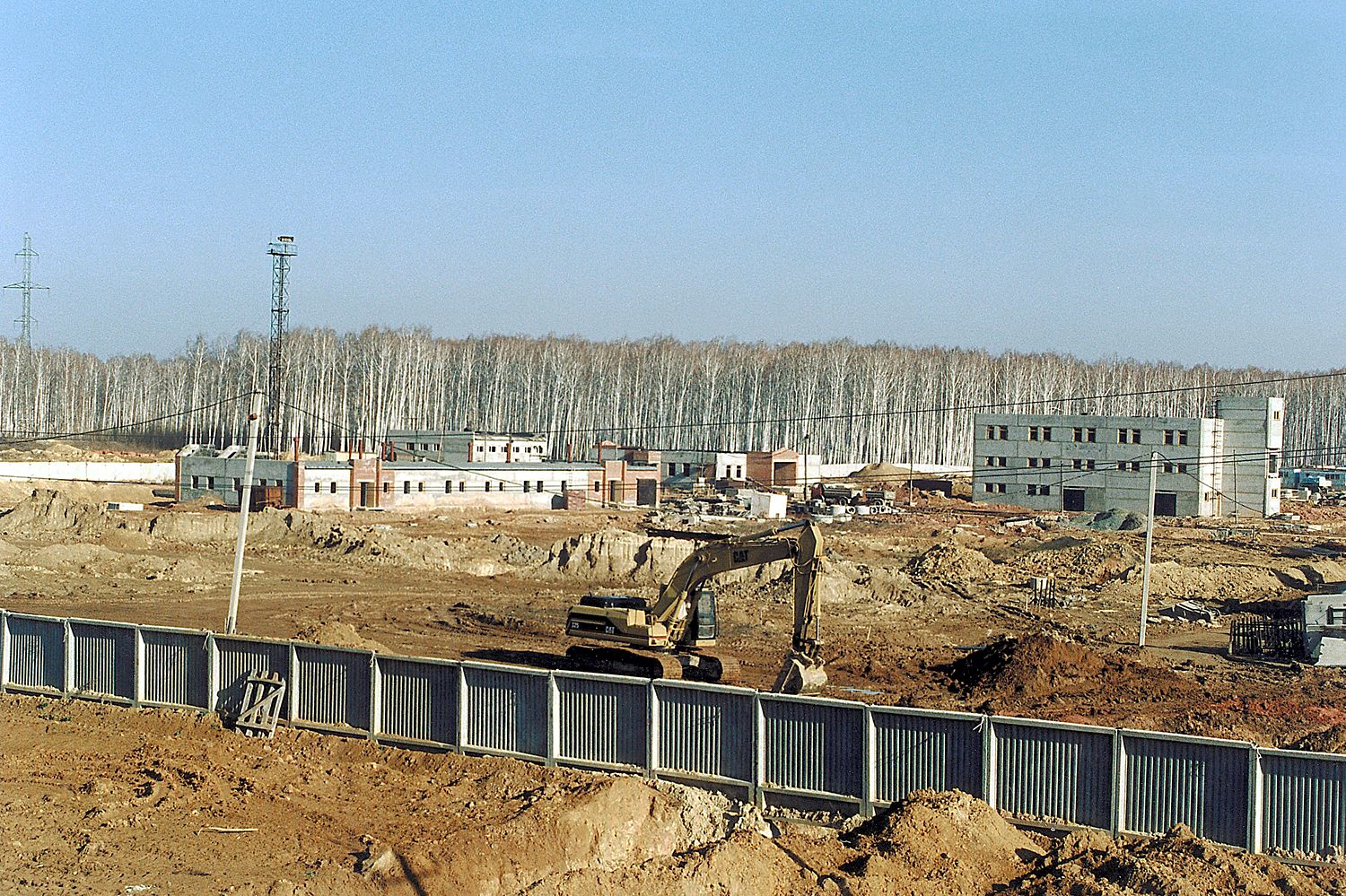
Fissile Material Storage Facility (FMSF). Looking at the administration building of the storage facility to include all the support facilities. Excavator is one of the pieces of construction equipment procured by the USACE.

The nuclear complex is 150 km south of Ekaterinburg, between the towns of Kasli and Tatysh, and 100 km northwest of Chelyabinsk. The closest city, Ozyorsk, is the central administrative territorial district. As part of the Russian (formerly Soviet) nuclear weapons program, Mayak was formerly known as Chelyabinsk-40 and later as Chelyabinsk-65, referring to the postal codes of the site.

== Design and structure ==
Mayak's nuclear facility plant covers about 90 square kilometres (35 sq mi). The site borders Ozyorsk, in which a majority of the staff of Mayak live. Mayak itself was not shown on Soviet public maps. The location of the site together with the plant city was chosen to minimise the effects that harmful emissions could potentially have on populated areas. Mayak is surrounded by a ~250 square kilometres (97 sq mi) exclusion zone. Nearby is the site of the South Urals nuclear power plant. (Note: This section copied and translated from the German Wikipedia entry for "Mayak", with some grammatical errors corrected)

=== Reactors ===
Plutonium production reactors in the USSR
Reactor name	Chief Designer	Design power (MWth)	Upgraded power (MWth)	Began operation	Shut down	Total plutonium (tons)	Design	Coolant circuit
A	NIKIET	100	900	19 June 1948	16 June 1987	6.138	LWGR	Single-pass
AV-1	OKBM Afrikantov	300	1200	5 April 1950	12 August 1989	8.508	LWGR	Single-pass
AV-2	OKBM Afrikantov	300	1200	6 April 1951	14 July 1990	8.407	LWGR	Single-pass
AV-3	OKBM Afrikantov	300	1200	15 September 1952	1 November 1990	7.822	LWGR	Single-pass
AI-IR	NIKIET	40	100	22 December 1952	25 May 1987	0.053	LWGR	Single-pass
OK-180		100	233	17 October 1951	3 March 1966	0	HWR	Closed-circuit
OK-190		300	300	27 December 1955	8 November 1965	0	HWR	Closed-circuit
OK-190M		300	300	16 April 1966	16 April 1986	0	HWR	Closed-circuit
LF-2 "Ludmila"		800	800	May 1988	In operation	0	HWR	Closed-circuit
"Ruslan"		800	1100	12 June 1979	In operation	0	LWR	Closed-circuit

== History ==
Built in total secrecy between 1945 and 1948, the Mayak plant was the first reactor used to create plutonium for the Soviet atomic bomb project. In accordance with Stalinist procedure and supervised by NKVD Chief Lavrentiy Beria, it was the utmost priority to produce enough weapons-grade material to match the U.S. nuclear superiority following the atomic bombings of Hiroshima and Nagasaki. Little to no consideration was paid to worker safety or responsible disposal of waste materials, and the reactors were all optimised for plutonium production, producing many tons of contaminated materials and utilising primitive open-cycle cooling systems which directly contaminated the thousands of gallons of cooling water the reactors used every day.

Lake Kyzyltash was the largest natural lake capable of providing cooling water to the reactors; it was rapidly contaminated via the open-cycle system. The closer Lake Karachay, too small to provide sufficient cooling water, was used as a dumping ground for large quantities of high-level radioactive waste too "hot" to store in the facility's underground storage vats. The original plan was to use the lake to store highly radioactive material until it could be returned to the Mayak facility's underground concrete storage vats, but this proved impossible due to the lethal levels of radioactivity (see Pollution of Lake Karachay). The lake was used for this purpose until the Kyshtym Disaster in 1957, in which the underground vats exploded due to a faulty cooling system. This incident caused widespread contamination of the entire Mayak area (as well as a large swath of territory to the northeast). This led to greater caution among the administration, fearing international attention, and caused the dumping grounds to be spread out over a variety of areas (including several lakes and the Techa River, along which many villages lay).

=== Kyshtym disaster ===
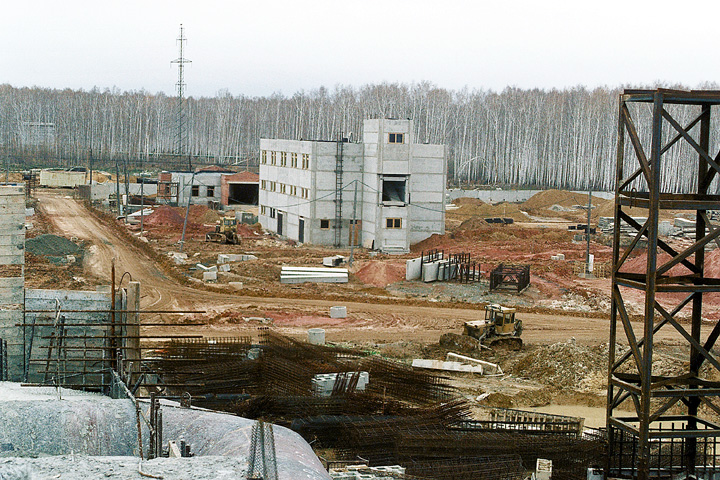
Fissile Material Storage Facility (FMSF). Looking at the south side of the main Administration Building and security building of the storage facility.

Working conditions at Mayak resulted in severe health hazards and many accidents. The most notable accident occurred on 29 September 1957, when the failure of the cooling system for a tank storing tens of thousands of tons of dissolved nuclear waste resulted in a chemical (non-nuclear) explosion having an energy estimated at 75 tons of TNT (310 gigajoules). This released 740 PBq (20 MCi) of fission products, of which 74 PBq (2 MCi) drifted off the site, creating a contaminated region of 15,000–20,000 square kilometres (5,800–7,700 sq mi) called the East Urals Radioactive trace. Subsequently, an estimated 49 to 55 people died of radiation-induced cancer, 66 were diagnosed with chronic radiation syndrome, 10,000 people were evacuated from their homes, and 470,000 people were exposed to radiation.

The Soviet Union did not release news of the accident and denied it happened for nearly 30 years. Residents of Chelyabinsk district in the Southern Urals reported observing "polar-lights" in the sky near the plant, and American aerial spy photos had documented the destruction caused by the disaster by 1960. This nuclear accident, the Soviet Union's worst before the Chernobyl disaster, is categorised as a Level 6 "Serious Accident" on the 0–7 International Nuclear Events Scale.

When Zhores Medvedev exposed the disaster in a 1976 article in New Scientist, some exaggerated claims circulated in the absence of any verifiable information from the Soviet Union. People "grew hysterical with fear with the incidence of unknown 'mysterious' diseases breaking out. Victims were seen with skin 'sloughing off' their faces, hands and other exposed parts of their bodies." As Zhores wrote, "Hundreds of square miles were left barren and unusable for decades and maybe centuries. Hundreds of people died, thousands were injured and surrounding areas were evacuated." Professor Leo Tumerman, former head of the Biophysics Laboratory at the Institute of Molecular Biology in Moscow, disclosed what he knew of the accident around the same time. Russian documents gradually declassified from 1989 onward show the true events were less severe than rumoured.

According to Gyorgy, who invoked the Freedom of Information Act to open up the relevant Central Intelligence Agency (CIA) files, the CIA knew of the 1957 Mayak accident, but kept it secret to prevent adverse consequences for the fledgling US nuclear industry. "Ralph Nader surmised that the information had not been released because of the reluctance of the CIA to highlight a nuclear accident in the USSR, that could cause concern among people living near nuclear facilities in the USA." Only in 1992, shortly after the fall of the USSR, did the Russians officially acknowledge the accident.

=== 1968 criticality incident ===
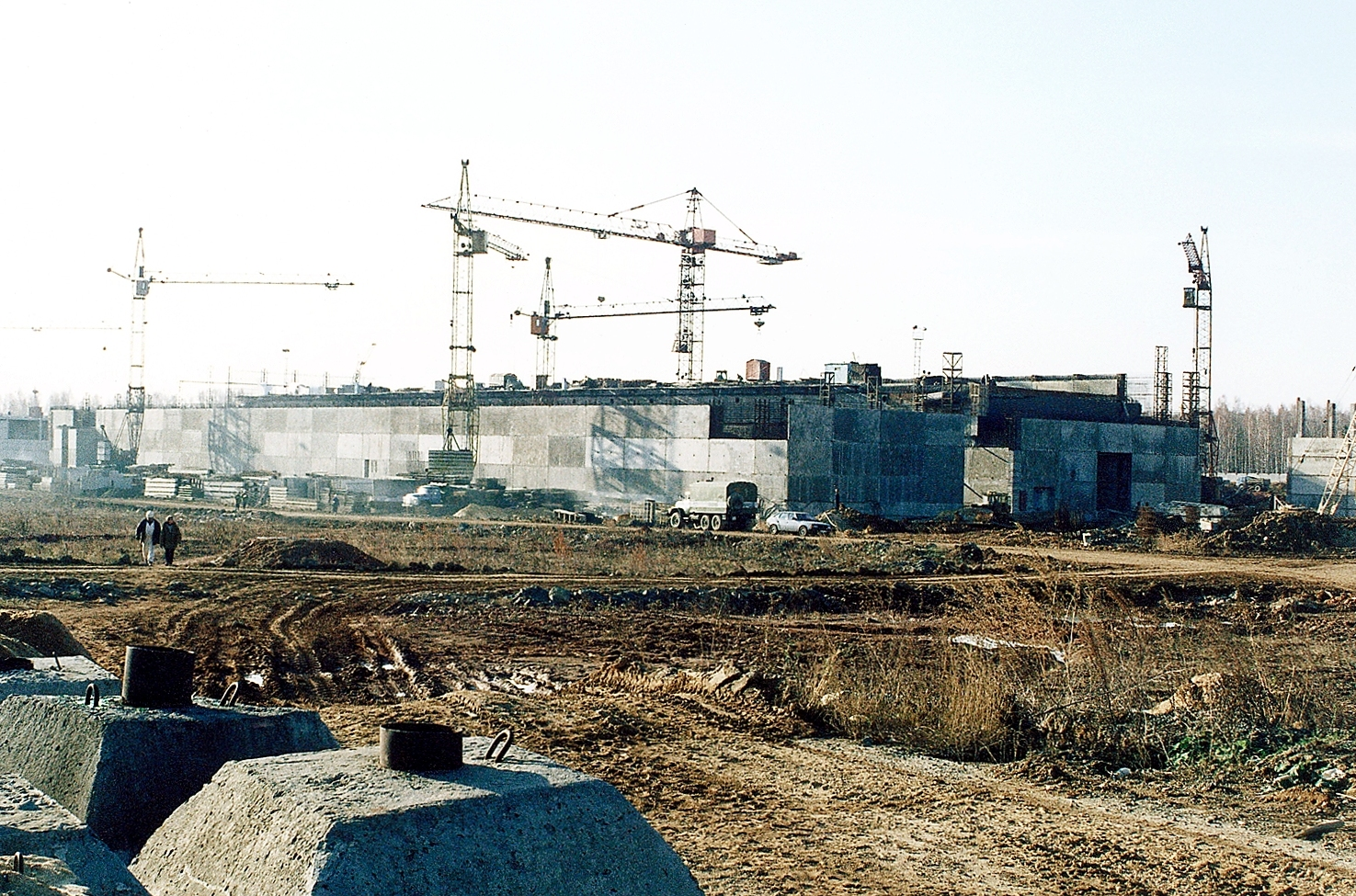
Looking at storage facility processing materials, controls, accountability, and fissile material container storage from south-west angle.

In December 1968, the facility was experimenting with plutonium purification techniques. Two operators were using an "unfavourable geometry vessel in an improvised and unapproved operation as a temporary vessel for storing plutonium organic solution". "Unfavourable geometry" means that the vessel was too compact, reducing the amount of plutonium needed to achieve a critical mass to less than the amount present. After most of the solution had been poured out, there was a flash of light and heat. After the complex had been evacuated, the shift supervisor and radiation control supervisor re-entered the building. The shift supervisor then entered the room of the incident, caused another, larger nuclear reaction and irradiated himself with a deadly dose of radiation.

=== 2017 radiation release ===
Abnormally high levels of radiation were reported in the area of the facility in November 2017. Simultaneously, traces of radioactive manmade isotope Ruthenium-106 spread across Europe in September and October. Such a release had not been seen on a continental scale since the Chernobyl accident. In January 2018, the French Institute of Radioprotection and Nuclear Security (IRSN) reported that the source of the contamination is located in the Volga – Southern Ural region between 25 and 28 September for a duration of less than 24 hours. The report excludes the possibility of an accidental release from a nuclear reactor, stating that it seems related with irradiated fuels processing or the production of sources from fission products solution. It may point to Mayak's aborted attempt to manufacture a capsule of highly radioactive component cerium-144, for the SOX project in Italy. Both the Russian government and Rosatom denied at the time that another accidental leak took place at Mayak. The release of a cloud of ruthenium-106 is similar to the B205 reprocessing accident in Britain in 1973.

== Environmental impact ==
In the early years of its operation, the Mayak plant directly discharged high-level nuclear waste into several small lakes near the plant, and into the Techa River, whose waters ultimately flow into the Ob River. According to the data of the Department of Natural Resources in the Ural Region, in the year 2000, more than 250 million cubic metres (8.8 billion cubic feet) of water containing thousands of curies of tritium, strontium, and cesium-137 were discharged into the Techa River. The tritium concentration alone in the river near the village of Muslyumovo exceeds the permissible limit by 30 times.

Rosatom, a state-owned nuclear operations corporation, began to resettle residents of Muslyumovo in 2006. However, only half of the residents of the village were moved. People continue to live in the immediate area of the plant, including Ozyorsk and other downstream areas. Residents report no problems with their health and the health of Mayak plant workers. However, these claims lack verification, and many who worked at the plant in 1950s and 1960s subsequently died from the effects of radiation. The administration of the Mayak plant has been repeatedly criticized in recent years by Greenpeace and other environmental advocates for environmentally unsound practices.

== List of accidents ==
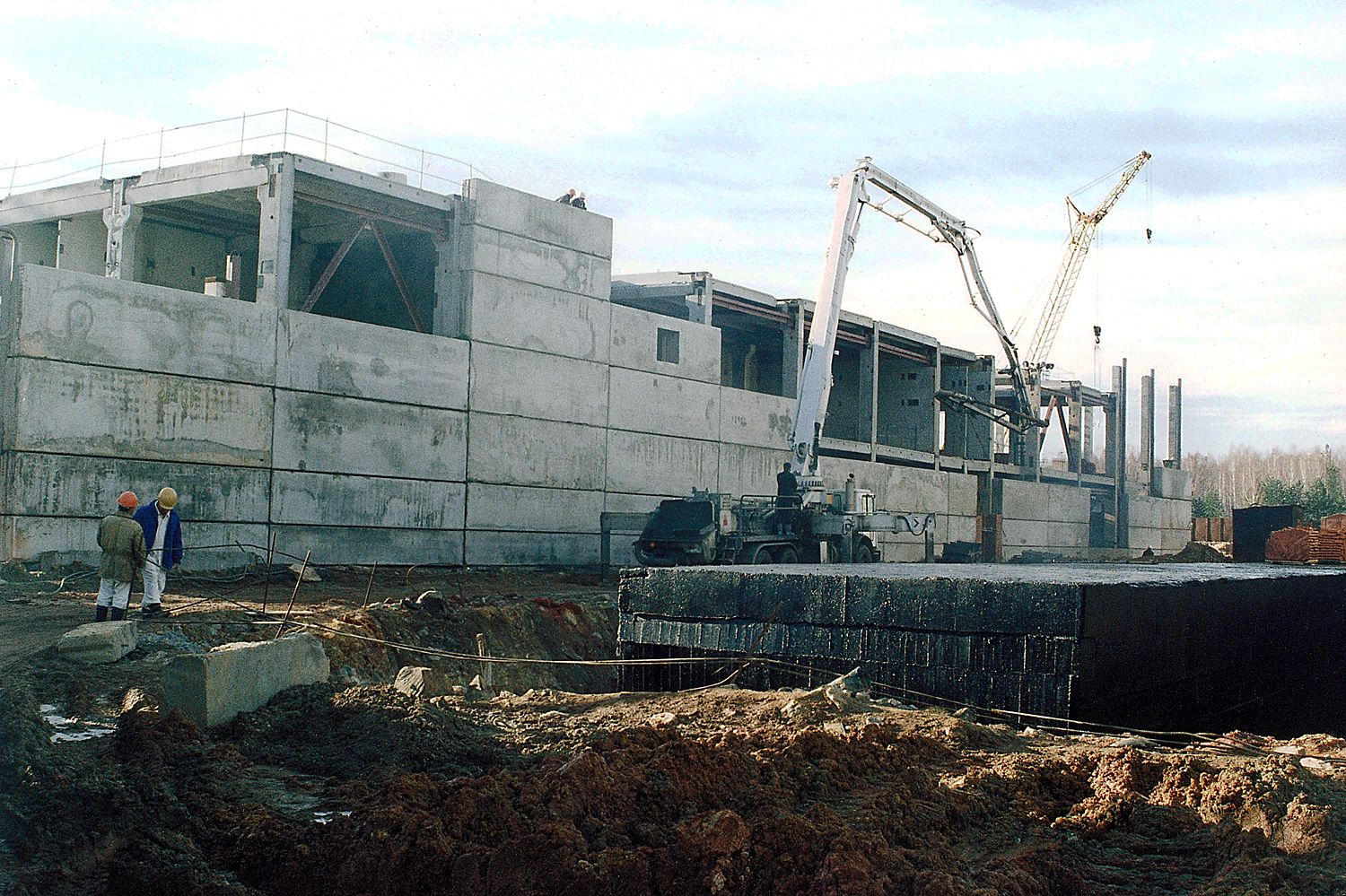
Fissile Material Storage Facility (FMSF). The building is the ventilation center of the storage facility. The ventilation tunnel showing in the north of the ventilation centre.

The Mayak plant is associated with two other major nuclear accidents. The first occurred as a result of heavy rains causing Lake Karachay, a dried-up radioactively polluted lake (used as a dumping basin for Mayak's radioactive waste since 1951), to release radioactive material into surrounding waters. The second occurred in 1967 when wind spread dust from the bottom of Lake Karachay over parts of Ozyorsk; over 400,000 people were irradiated..

=== Major accidents at Mayak, 1953–1998 ===
- 15 March 1953 – Criticality accident. Contamination of plant personnel occurred.
- 13 October 1955 – Rupture of process equipment and the destruction of a process building.
- 21 April 1957 – Criticality accident. One operator died from receiving over 3000 rad. Five others received doses of 300 to 1,000 rem and temporarily became sick with radiation poisoning.
- 29 September 1957 – Kyshtym disaster.
- 2 January 1958 – Criticality accident in SCR plant. Plant workers conducted experiments to determine the critical mass of enriched uranium in a cylindrical container with different concentrations of uranium in solution. Personnel received doses from 7600 to 13,000 rem, resulting in three deaths and one case of blindness caused by radiation sickness.
- 12 May 1960 – Criticality accident. Five people were contaminated.
- 26 February 1962 – Destruction of equipment. An explosion occurred in the absorption column.
- 9 July 1962 – Criticality accident.
- 16 December 1965 – Criticality accident. Seventeen individuals received exposure to small amounts of radiation over a period of 14 hours.
- 10 December 1968 – Criticality accident. Plutonium solution was poured into a cylindrical container with dangerous geometry. One person died, another took a high dose of radiation and radiation sickness, after which he had both legs and his right arm amputated.
- 11 February 1976 – Unsafe actions of staff development at the radiochemical plant caused an autocatalytic reaction of concentrated nitric acid and organic liquid complex composition. The device exploded, contaminating the repair zone and areas around the plant. The incident merited an International Nuclear Event Scale rating of 3.
- 10 February 1984 – Explosion.
- 16 November 1990 – Explosion. Two people received burns and one was killed.
- 17 July 1993 – Accident at radioisotope plant, resulting in the destruction of the absorption column and release into the environment of a small amount of α-aerosols. Radiation emission was localised at the manufacturing facility of the shop.
- 8 February 1993 – Depressurisation of a pipeline caused 2 cubic metres (71 cu ft) of radioactive slurry (about 100 square metres (1,100 sq ft) of contaminated surface) to leak to the surface of the pulp radioactive activity of about 0.3 Ci. Radioactive trace was localised, contaminated soil removed.
- 27 December 1993 – Incident at radioisotope plant where the replacement of a filter resulted in the release into the atmosphere of radioactive aerosols. Emissions were on the α-activity of 0.033 Ci, and β-activity of 0.36 mCi.
- 4 February 1994 – Recorded increased release of radioactive aerosols: the β-activity of 2-day levels of Cs-137 subsistence levels, the total activity of 7.15 mCi.
- 30 March 1994 – Recorded excess daily release of Cs-137 in 3, β-activity – 1,7, α-activity – by 1.9 times. In May 1994 the ventilation system of the building of the plant spewed activity 10.4 mCi β-aerosols. Emission of Cs-137 was 83% of the control level.
- 7 July 1994 – The control plant detected a radioactive spot area of several square decimetres. Exposure dose was 500 millirems per second. The spot was formed by leaking sewage.
- 31 August 1994 – Registered an increased release of radionuclides to the atmospheric pipe building reprocessing plant (238.8 mCi, with the share of Cs-137 was 4.36% of the annual emission limit of this radionuclide). The reason for the release of radionuclides was depressurisation of VVER-440 fuel elements during the operation segments idle all SFA (spent fuel assemblies) as a result of an uncontrollable arc.
- 24 March 1995 – Recorded excess of 19% of normal loading apparatus plutonium, which can be regarded as a dangerous nuclear incident.
- 15 September 1995 – High-level liquid radioactive waste (LRW) was found in flow of cooling water. Operation of a furnace into the regulatory regime has been discontinued.
- 21 December 1995 – Cutting of a thermometric channel exposed four workers (1.69, 0.59, 0.45, 0.34 rem) when operators violated process procedures.
- 24 July 1995 – Cs-137 aerosols released, the value of which amounted to 0.27% of the annual value of MPE for the enterprise.
- 14 September 1995 – Replacement covers and lubrication of ball manipulators registered a sharp increase in airborne α-nuclides.
- 22 October 1996 – Depressurisation occurred in a coil while channeling cooling water from one storage tanks of high-level waste. The result was contaminated pipe cooling system repositories. As a result of this incident, 10 people were exposed to radiation dose of 2.23 to 48 milli-Sieverts.
- 20 November 1996 – A chemical-metallurgical plant in the works on the electrical exhaust fan caused aerosol release of radionuclides into the atmosphere, which made up 10% of the allowed annual emissions of the plant.
- 27 August 1997 – In building RT-1 in one of the rooms was found to be contaminated floor area of 1 to 2 m^{2}, the dose rate of gamma radiation from the spot was between 40 and 200 mR / s.
- 6 October 1997 – Recorded increasing radioactivity in the assembly building, the RT-1. Measurement of the exposure dose indicated up to 300 mR / s.
- 23 September 1998 – While increasing power output of reactor P-2 ("Lyudmila") after engaging automatic protection allowable power level was exceeded by 10%. As a result, the three channels of the fuel rod seal failed, resulting in the contamination of equipment and pipelines of the first circuit. (Note: All of the above list transferred directly from the Russian Wikipedia entry for "Mayak". Translated and some grammatical errors corrected)

=== More recent major accidents ===
- In 2003, the plant's operating licence was revoked temporarily due to liquid radioactive waste handling procedures resulting in waste being disposed into open water.
- In June 2007, an accident involving a radioactive pulp occurred over a two-day period.
- In October 2007, a valve failure during transport of a radioactive liquid resulted in spilling of a radioactive material.
- In 2008, a repair worker was injured during a "pneumatic" incident, involving a quantity of alpha emitter release. The worker's hand was injured and the wound contaminated. The worker's finger was amputated in an attempt to minimize spread of alpha-particle emitters throughout his body and subsequent radiological consequences.
- In September 2017, possible association with the airborne radioactivity increase in Europe in autumn 2017. Russia confirms 'extremely high' readings of radioactive pollution in Argayash, a village in the Chelyabinsk region of the southern Urals. Argayash is located 10 miles south of the Mayak plant. In January 2018, the French Institute of Radioprotection and Nuclear Security (IRSN) reported that Mayak could be the cause of the contamination. The radioactivity was due to Ru-106 indicating release from a late stage in the reprocessing (i.e. after the Ru-106 had been separated from other isotopes).

== See also ==
- City 40
- List of civilian nuclear accidents
- List of military nuclear accidents
- Nuclear and radiation accidents and incidents
- Ozyorsk, Chelyabinsk Oblast
- Radioactive contamination
- Radioactive waste
- Reprocessed uranium
- Techa River, the radioactive river
