= Alexis Pappas =

Norwegian chemist (1915–2010)

Alexis Constantin Georg Pappas (16 October 1915 – 12 February 2010) was a Norwegian chemist. Born in London to Greek expatriates in 1915, he moved to Norway a few years later together with his parents. He specialized in nuclear chemistry, and was a professor from 1957 to 1985.

His family used to live in Belgium, but sought refuge in England during World War I, the family then moved to Norway after the war. Pappas finished his secondary education at Frogner School in 1934 and enrolled at the Royal Frederick University. His master's advisor (in radiation chemistry) was Ellen Gleditsch, and he graduated with the cand.real. degree in 1940. He started working in the private business, but was also a research assistant for Gleditsch. From 1947 to 1952, he was a research fellow, with included studies at the Institut du Radium and the Collège de France, and from 1949 to 1951 at the Massachusetts Institute of Technology. In 1952, he returned to Norway, where he worked at the University of Oslo's quarters for the research council NTNF. In 1954, he took the Dr. Philos degree on the thesis A Radiochemical Study of Fission Yields. From 1954 to 1957, he worked in Uppsala.

With funding from the Norwegian Cancer Society Pappas was given a professorship in radioisotope studies in 1957. The professorship was changed to nuclear chemistry in 1962, still at the University of Oslo. He retired in 1985. An adviser and sporadic guest scholar at CERN from 1957 to 1967, he served as the Norwegian delegate to CERN Council between 1968 and 1983, and vice president from 1976 to 1978. He was also deputy chairman of the Norwegian Nuclear Energy Safety Authority from 1973 to 1993, during its entire existence, and also the president of the Norwegian Chemical Society from 1966 to 1970. He was a member of the Norwegian Academy of Science and Letters from 1959 to his death, honorary member of the Norwegian Chemical Society from 1993, and in 1979 he was made a Knight 1st Class of the Royal Norwegian Order of St. Olav in 1979.

He married Ela Mjøset (1917–2000) in 1942. He died in February 2010 in Oslo.
