= Pollution of Lake Karachay =

Radioactive contamination of Lake Karachay

Coordinates: 55°40′38.8″N 60°47′56.5″E

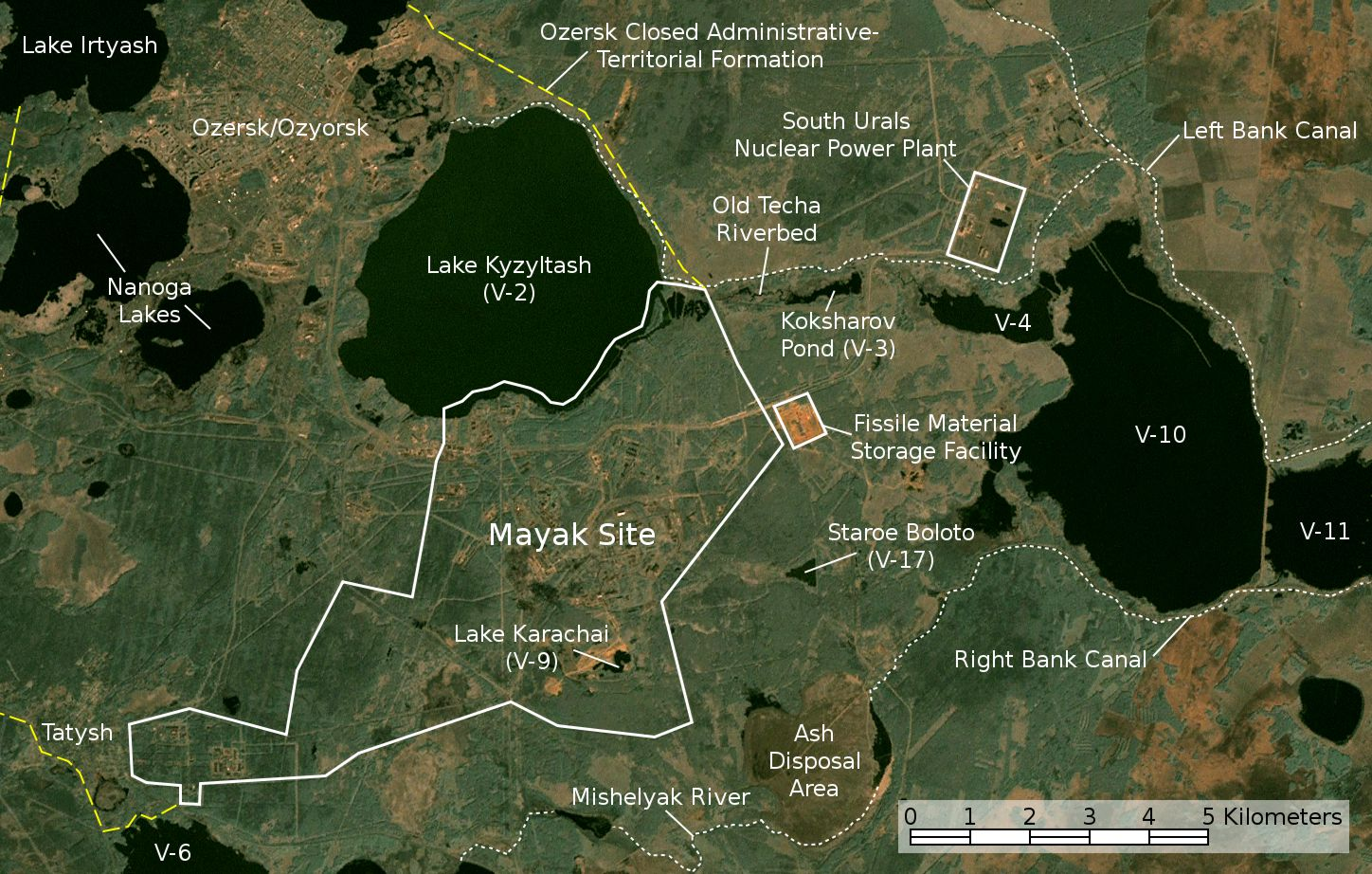
A satellite view of Lake Karachay.

Lake Karachay was a small natural lake in central Russia. It is best known for its use as a dumping ground by the Soviet Union's Mayak nuclear weapons laboratory and fuel reprocessing plant. A string of accidents and disasters at the Mayak facility has contaminated much of the surrounding area with highly radioactive waste. In the 1960s, the lake began to dry out and its area had dropped from 0.5 km^{2} in 1951 to 0.15 km^{2} by the end of 1993. In 1968, following a drought in the region, the wind carried 185 PBq (5 MCi) of radioactive dust away from the dried bed of the lake, irradiating half a million people. Lake Karachay has been described as the "most polluted spot on Earth" by the Worldwatch Institute.

== History ==
Built in the late 1940s, Mayak was one of Russia's most prominent nuclear weapons factories. The factory was kept secret by the government until 1990. When Russian president Boris Yeltsin signed a 1992 decree opening the area, Western scientists were able to gain access. The sediment of the lake bed is estimated to be composed almost entirely of high level radioactive waste deposits to a depth of roughly 11 feet (3.4 m).

In 1994, a report revealed that 5 million cubic meters of polluted water had migrated from Lake Karachay, and was spreading to the south and north at 80 meters per year, "threatening to enter water intakes and rivers". The authors acknowledged that "theoretical hazards developed into actual events".

In November 1994, officials from the Russian Ministry of Atomic Energy stated that Soviet officials initiated a process following the 1957 Kyshtym disaster resulting in the transfer of 3 billion curies of high level nuclear waste into deep wells at three other sites.

After a drought caused water levels to drop, revealing contaminated silt, which was then wind blown, further polluting surrounding areas, it was decided to completely fill in the lake. As of December 2016, the lake's status is completely infilled, using special concrete blocks, rock, and dirt. It had been completely backfilled in November 2015, then monitored before placing the final layer of rock and dirt. Monitoring data showed "clear reduction of the deposition of radionuclides on the surface" after 10 months. A decades-long monitoring program for underground water was expected to be implemented shortly after.

The Techa River, which provides water to nearby areas, was contaminated, and about 65% of local residents fell ill with radiation sickness. Doctors called it the "special disease" because they were not allowed to note radiation in their diagnoses as long as the facility was secret. In the village of Metlino, it was found that 65% of residents were suffering from chronic radiation sickness. Workers at the plutonium plant were also affected.

== Causes ==
The pollution of Lake Karachay is connected to the disposal of nuclear materials from Mayak. Among workers, cancer mortality remains an issue. By one estimate, the Techa river contains 120 million curies of radioactive waste.

== Prevalence of pollution ==
Nuclear waste, either from civilian or military nuclear projects, remains a serious threat to the environment of Russia. Reports suggest that there are few or no road signs warning about the polluted areas surrounding Lake Karachay. This is exacerbated by historically poor responses to high-level nuclear accidents.

== See also ==
- Lake Karachay
- Water pollution
- Plutopia
- Ozyorsk, Chelyabinsk Oblast
- Semipalatinsk Test Site
- Soviet atomic bomb project
