= Lake Karachay =

Radioactive waste dumping site in Russia

- Карача́й (Russian)
- Location within Russia
- Coordinates: 55°40′42″N 60°47′59″E
- Type: Reservoir
- Basin countries: Russia
- Settlements: Ozyorsk

Lake Karachay (Russian: Карача́й), sometimes spelled Karachai or Karachaj, was a small lake in the southern Ural Mountains in central Russia. Starting in 1951, the Soviet Union used Karachay as a dumping site for radioactive waste from Mayak, the nearby nuclear waste storage and reprocessing facility, located near the town of Ozyorsk (then called Chelyabinsk-40). Today the lake is completely infilled, acting as "a near-surface permanent and dry nuclear waste storage facility." Its radioactivity is comparable to the Chernobyl disaster.

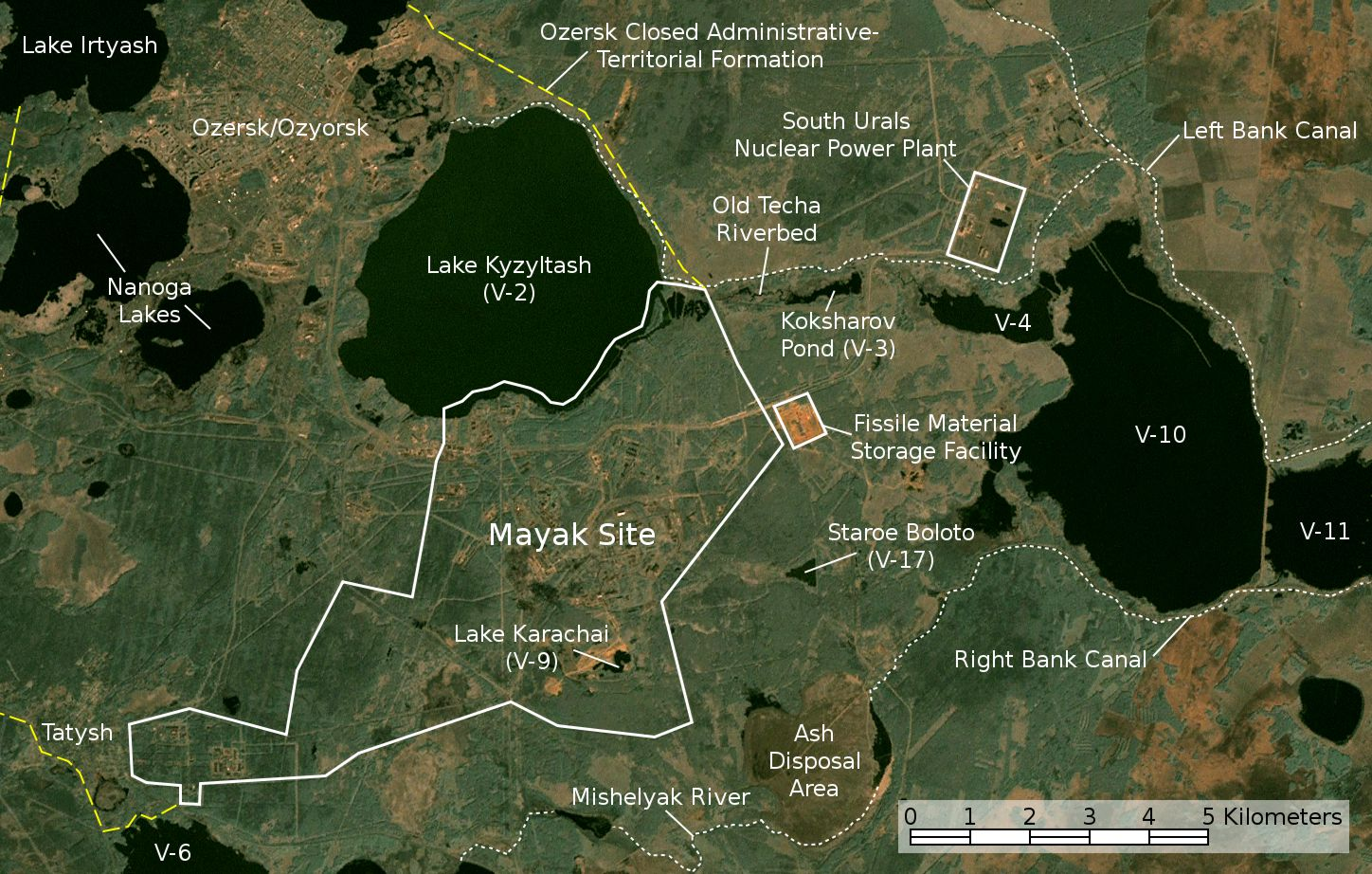
Satellite image/map of Lake Karachay

== Background ==
The name karachay means "black water" or "black creek" in several Northwestern Turkic languages, including Tatar. It is also the name of the Kipchak-Cuman Turkic peoples living in the North Caucasus, Karachays.

Built in total secrecy between 1946 and 1948, the Mayak plant was the first reactor used to create plutonium for the Soviet atomic bomb project. In accordance with Stalinist procedure and supervised by NKVD Chief Lavrentiy Beria, it was the utmost priority to produce enough weapons-grade material to match the U.S. nuclear superiority following the atomic bombings of Hiroshima and Nagasaki. Little to no consideration was paid to worker safety or responsible disposal of waste materials, and the reactors all were optimized for plutonium production, producing many tons of contaminated materials and utilizing open-cycle cooling systems which directly contaminated the thousands of liters of cooling water the reactors used every day.

Lake Kyzyltash was the largest natural lake capable of providing cooling water to the reactors; it was rapidly contaminated because of the use of the open-cycle system. Lake Karachay was even closer; however the lake was too small to provide sufficient cooling water. Lake Karachay was then designated a close-by and convenient dumping ground for large quantities of high-level radioactive waste too "hot" to store in the facility's underground storage vats. The original plan was to use the lake to store highly radioactive material until it could be returned to the Mayak facility's underground concrete storage vats, however it later became impossible due to the lethal levels of radioactivity. The lake was used for this purpose until the Kyshtym Disaster in 1957, in which the underground vats exploded due to a faulty cooling system. This incident caused widespread contamination of the entire Mayak area (as well as a large swath of territory to the northeast). This led to greater caution among the administration, fearing international attention, and caused the dumping grounds to be spread out over a variety of areas (including several lakes and the Techa River, along which many villages lay).

In the 1960s, the lake began to dry out; its area dropped from 0.5 km^{2} in 1951 to 0.15 km^{2} by the end of 1993. In 1968, following a drought in the region, the wind carried 185 PBq (5 MCi) of radioactive dust away from the dried area of the lake, irradiating half a million people.

Between 1978 and 1986, the lake was filled with almost 10,000 hollow concrete blocks to prevent sediments from shifting. Conservation of the affected area continued into the 2000s via the federal target program "Nuclear and Radiation Safety in 2008 and for the period up to 2015", with the rest of the lake finally being backfilled in November 2015. Conservation work was completed in December 2016 with the final layer of rock and soil being added, effectively making the former lake "a near-surface permanent and dry nuclear waste storage facility."

== Current status ==
According to a report by the Worldwatch Institute on nuclear waste, Karachay is the most polluted (open-air) place on Earth from a radiological point of view. The lake accumulated some 4.44 exabecquerels (EBq) of radioactivity over less than one square mile of water, including 3.6 EBq of caesium-137 and 0.74 EBq of strontium-90. For comparison, the Chernobyl disaster released 0.085 EBq of caesium-137, a much smaller amount and over thousands of square miles. (The total Chernobyl release is estimated between 5 and 12 EBq of radioactivity, however essentially only caesium-134/137 [and to a lesser extent, strontium-90] contribute to land contamination because the rest is too short-lived.) The sediment of the lake bed is estimated to be composed almost entirely of high-level radioactive waste deposits to a depth of roughly 3.4 metres (11 ft).

In 1990, the radiation level in the region near where radioactive effluent was discharged into the lake was 600 röntgens per hour (approximately 6 Sv/h) according to the Natural Resources Defense Council, sufficient to give a lethal dose to a human within less than an hour.

As of December 2016, the lake's status is completely infilled, using special concrete blocks, rock, and dirt. It had been completely backfilled in November 2015, then monitored before placing the final layer of rock and dirt. Monitoring data showed "clear reduction of the deposition of radionuclides on the surface" after 10 months. A decades-long monitoring program for underground water was expected to be implemented shortly after.

== See also ==
- Church Rock uranium mill spill, the largest environmental release of radiological material in the United States
- Hanford Site, the United States' worst nuclear industry polluted site
- Norilsk, included in the Blacksmith Institute's 2007 list of the ten most polluted places on Earth
