= Light water graphite reactor =

The light water graphite reactor (LWGR) is a design of nuclear reactor that uses purified graphite as a neutron moderator and light water (H_{2}O) as a liquid coolant. Due to the superior moderating properties of graphite, natural uranium can be used as a fuel, avoiding enrichment.

The design was developed during the Manhattan Project, in a horizontal layout, first used in the 1944 B Reactor, also the world's first large-scale reactor. The Project's Hanford Site constructed nine LWGRs in total for plutonium production, used throughout the Cold War. The Soviet Union subsequently developed a vertical design for use in military plutonium production reactors, constructed at Mayak, the Siberian Chemical Combine in Seversk, and the Mining and Chemical Combine in Zhelenogorsk. China's nuclear weapons program also developed two military plutonium production LWGRs. Reactors used for plutonium production in the nuclear weapons programs of the United Kingdom, France, and North Korea used gas-cooled reactors (GCRs) moderated by graphite, while those used by Israel, India, and Pakistan were believed to be heavy water reactors (HWRs).

The Soviet Union also developed civilian power prototypes eventually into the RBMK design, the only widespread use of LWGRs for commercial nuclear power plants. RBMKs use slightly enriched uranium (<2% ^{235}U).

Selected examples of LWGRs
Reactor	Country	Criticality date	Initial power (MWth)	Notes	Refs.
B Reactor	United States	26 September 1944	250	First LWGR, twin D and F reactors built under Manhattan Project	
A-1	USSR	10 June 1948	100	First Soviet plutonium production reactor; in Mayak	
AM-1	USSR	6 May 1954	30	First LWGR to generate electricity	
AMB-100	USSR	1 September 1963	286	SCWR test?	
N Reactor	United States	8 December 1963	4000	Also Hanford Site, shutdown following Chernobyl disaster	
AMB-200	USSR	10 October 1967	530	SCWR test?	
Chernobyl Reactor 4 (RBMK)	USSR	26 November 1983	3200	Reactor exploded in 1986, worst nuclear accident in history	
Jiuquan reactor	China	1966	~250	China's first plutonium production reactor, military use	
Guangyan reactor	China	1973	~250	Third Front facility, military use	

== See also ==
- RBMK
- Hanford Engineer Works
- Hanford Site
- Void coefficient
