= Threemile Creek (Minnesota River tributary) =

Stream in Renville County, Minnesota, U.S.

Coordinates: 44°28′23″N 94°48′36″W

Threemile Creek is a stream in Renville County, in the U.S. state of Minnesota. It is a tributary of the Minnesota River.

Threemile Creek was so named from its distance, three miles (4.8 km) from Fort Ridgely.

== See also ==
- List of rivers of Minnesota
