= Three Mile, West Virginia =

- Unincorporated community
- Location within West Virginia and the United States Three Mile (the United States)
- Coordinates: 38°25′49″N 81°25′46″W
- Country: United States
- State: West Virginia
- County: Kanawha
- Elevation: 636 ft (194 m)
- Time zone: UTC-5 (Eastern (EST))
  - Summer (DST): UTC-4 (EDT)
- GNIS ID: 1548068

Three Mile is an unincorporated community in Kanawha County, West Virginia, United States. Its post office is closed.

There is a Wesleyan Church in Three Mile.
