= Threemile Creek (Missouri) =

Stream in the U.S. state of Missouri

Threemile Creek is a stream in northern Crawford and Franklin counties in the U.S. state of Missouri. It is a tributary to the Little Bourbeuse River.

The stream headwaters are in northern Crawford County at 38°08′36″N 91°23′14″W and the confluence with the Little Bourbeuse is in the southwestern corner of Franklin County at 38°12′56″N 91°21′28″W. The southeastern corner of Gasconade County is within the stream floodplain about 50 feet from the stream channel. The elevation at the stream confluence is 732 feet and the elevation of the source is at about 980 feet.

Threemile Creek most likely was descriptively named on account of an estimate of its length.

== See also ==
- List of rivers of Missouri
