= Nuclear incident at Khabarovsk, Russia =

Radiation incident in Russia (2024)

On April 5, 2024, a state of emergency was declared in Khabarovsk, a city in Russia's Far East bordering China with a population of 630,000. Elevated Radiation levels were detected near a power pylon approximately 2.5 kilometers from residential buildings. The source of radiation was discovered to be a radioactive caesium capsule.

Location of Khabarovsk

== Discovery and response ==
On March 28, a potential radiation source was discovered at a power pylon 2.5 kilometers away from residential buildings in the industrial district of Khabarovsk. A resident alerted emergency services, however they only arrived on April 4. A Russian radiation control group ECHO arrived on April 3. They reported to Novaya Gazeta: "The citizen who discovered the radiation was simply passing by. I went out to look and found such an interesting "find" near the power line. Initially, the resident reported to the Ministry of Emergency Situations; they sent requests for several days. We, volunteers, visited the site on April 3." The volunteers detected a maximum radioactivity level of 800 microsieverts, a rate 1600 time higher than the background rate of 0.5 microsieverts. Footage also emerged on social media of a man wearing protective equipment carrying a radiation meter saying the radiation increases as he approaches a waste dump.

A state of emergency was declared on April 5 by the city's authorities, and a 900 square meter area around the source was cordoned off. The state of emergency was declared to allow specialists to work faster, according to the city's head of civil defence Andrey Kolchin. Initial reports indicated that no injuries or radiation exposure had occurred among the residents, and residents were reassured by authorities there was no health risk. The radiation spike was only recorded in the near vicinity of the source, and no excess radiation was recorded outside the exclusion zone.

The radiation source was revealed to be a radioactive caesium capsule from a detector. After its removal, authorities said the capsule was subject to further investigation.

The state of emergency was lifted on April 8.

== Environmental impact ==
After the radiation source was located, it was sealed in a protective container to be transported to a nuclear waste storage facility. Officials said there was no environmental pollution.

== See also ==
- Nyonoksa radiation accident
- Chernobyl disaster
