= Chronic radiation syndrome =

Health problem caused by frequent doses of ionizing radiation

Chronic radiation syndrome (CRS), or chronic radiation enteritis, is a constellation of health effects of radiation that occur after months or years of chronic exposure to high amounts of radiation. Chronic radiation syndrome develops with a speed and severity proportional to the radiation dose received (i.e., it is a deterministic effect of exposure to ionizing radiation), unlike radiation-induced cancer. It is distinct from acute radiation syndrome, in that it occurs at dose rates low enough to permit natural repair mechanisms to compete with the radiation damage during the exposure period. Dose rates high enough to cause the acute form (> ~0.1 Gy/h) are fatal long before onset of the chronic form. The lower threshold for chronic radiation syndrome is between 0.7 and 1.5 Gy, at dose rates above 0.1 Gy/yr. This condition is primarily known from the Kyshtym disaster, where 66 cases were diagnosed. It has received little mention in Western literature; but see the ICRP’s 2012 Statement.

In 2013, Alexander V. Akleyev described the chronology of the clinical course of CRS while presenting at ConRad in Munich, Germany. In his presentation, he defined the latent period as being 1–5 years, and the formation coinciding with the period of maximum radiation dose. The recovery period was described as being 3–12 months after exposure ceased. He concluded that "CRS represents a systemic response of the body as a whole to the chronic total body exposure in man." In 2014, Akleyev's book "Comprehensive analysis of chronic radiation syndrome, covering epidemiology, pathogenesis, pathoanatomy, diagnosis and treatment" was published by Springer.

Symptoms of chronic radiation syndrome would include, at an early stage, impaired sense of touch and smell and disturbances of the vegetative functions. At a later stage, muscle and skin atrophy and eye cataract follow, with possible fibrous formations on the skin, in case of previous radiation burns. Solid cancer or leukemia due to genetic damage may appear at any time.
