= Threemile Creek (Licking River tributary) =

Stream in Kentucky, USA

Coordinates: 39°03′03″N 84°29′38″W

Threemile Creek is a stream in Campbell County, Kentucky, in the United States. It is a tributary of the Licking River.

Threemile Creek was so named from the fact it is both three miles (4.8 km) long and three miles from the Ohio River.

A defensive position originally called Threemile Creek Battery was built in 1861 as part of the Defense of Cincinnati in the Civil War and it took its name from the nearby creek.

== See also ==
- List of rivers of Kentucky
