= Three Mile Island (disambiguation) =

The Three Mile Island Nuclear Generating Station is a shut-down nuclear power plant in eastern Pennsylvania, United States.

Three Mile Island may also refer to:

- Three Mile Island accident, a partial core meltdown at the plant occurring in 1979
  - Three Mile Island accident health effects
- Three Mile Island: Thirty Minutes to Meltdown, a 1982 book about the accident
- Three Mile Island (video game), a 1979 simulation game about the accident for the Apple II
- Three Mile Island (Lake Winnipesaukee), an island in New Hampshire, United States
