= Norwegian Nuclear Energy Safety Authority =

The Norwegian Nuclear Energy Safety Authority (Norwegian: Statens atomtilsyn) is a defunct Norwegian government agency that was responsible for inspection of nuclear affairs in the country.

It was established in 1973. In 1993 it was merged with the National Institute of Radiation Hygiene to form the Norwegian Radiation Protection Authority.
