= Ozyorsk, Chelyabinsk Oblast =

Closed city in Chelyabinsk Oblast, Russia

Ozyorsk Озёрск
- Town
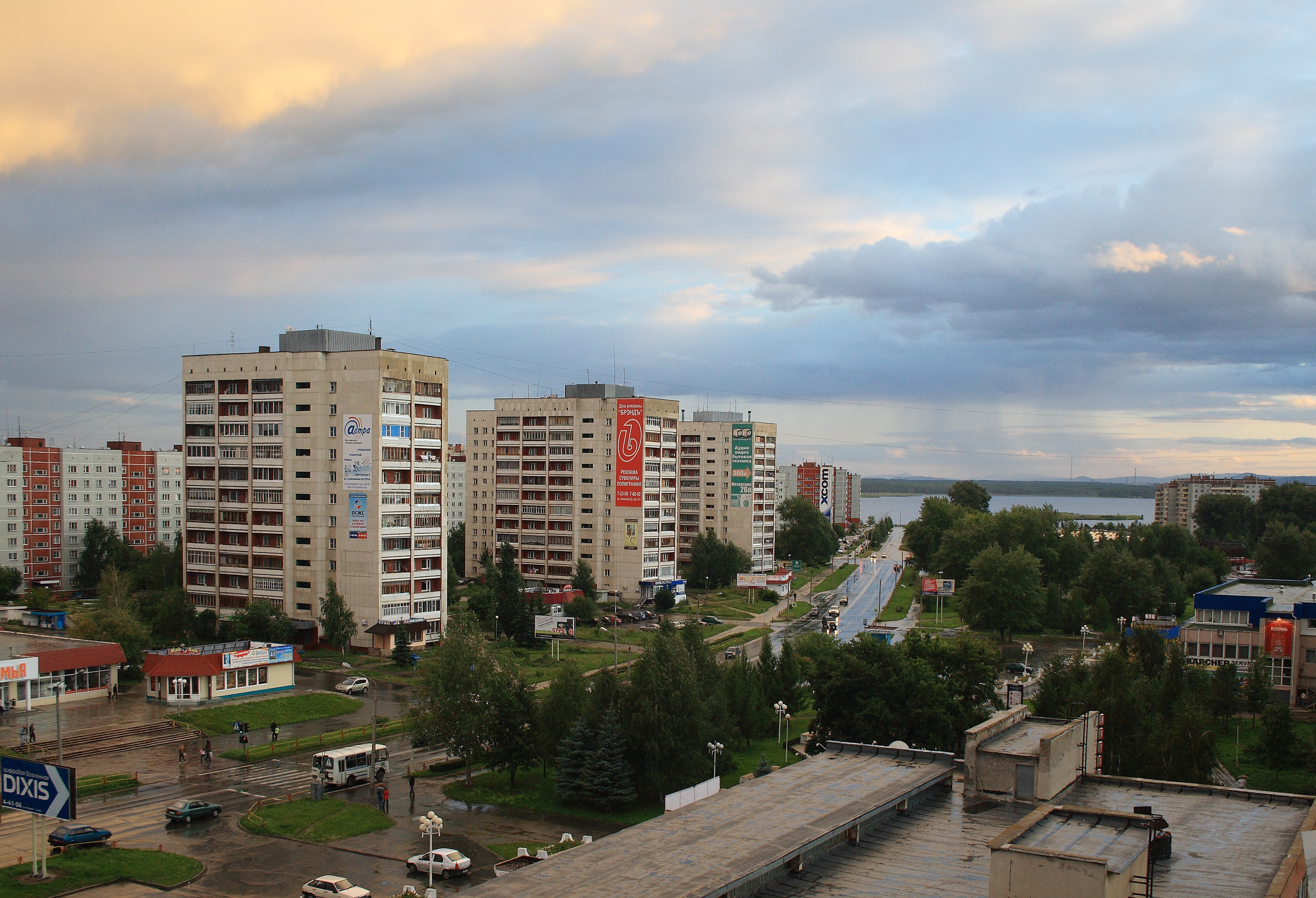
- A view of Karl Marx Avenue in Ozyorsk.

- Flag Coat of arms
- Interactive map of Ozyorsk
- Location of Ozyorsk Ozyorsk (Chelyabinsk Oblast)
- Coordinates: 55°45′N 60°43′E
- Country: Russia
- Federal subject: Chelyabinsk Oblast
- Founded: 1945
- Town status since: 1994

Government
  - Head: Oleg Kostikov
- Elevation: 240 m (790 ft)

Population (2010 Census)
  - Total: 82,164
  - Estimate (2025): 75,395 (−8.2%)
  - Rank: 202nd in 2010

Administrative status
  - Subordinated to: Town of Ozyorsk
  - Capital of: Town of Ozyorsk

Municipal status
  - Urban okrug: Ozyorsky Urban Okrug
  - Capital of: Ozyorsky Urban Okrug
- Time zone: UTC+5 (MSK+2)
- Postal code: 456780-456790
- Dialing code: +7 35130
- OKTMO ID: 75743000001
- Website: ozerskadm.ru

Ozyorsk or Ozersk (Russian: Озёрск) is a closed city in Chelyabinsk Oblast, Russia. It had a population of 82,164 as of the 2010 census.

== History ==
The town was founded on the shores of Lake Irtyash in 1947. Until 1994, it was known as Chelyabinsk-65, and even earlier, as Chelyabinsk-40 (the name is taken from the nearest city Chelyabinsk, which was a common practice of giving names to closed towns, plus the last digits of the postal code). Codenamed City 40, Ozyorsk was the birthplace of the Soviet nuclear weapons program launched after the Second World War. Ozyorsk and Richland in the US were the first two cities in the world to produce plutonium for use in Cold War atomic bombs. In 1994, it was granted town status and renamed Ozyorsk. This name, roughly meaning "Lake Town" in Russian, references the city's numerous nearby lakes.

=== Kyshtym disaster ===
In 1957, the Mayak plant was the site of a major disaster, releasing more radioactive contamination than the meltdown at Chernobyl. An improperly stored underground tank of high-level liquid nuclear waste exploded, contaminating thousands of square kilometres of territory, now known as the Eastern Ural Radioactive Trace (EURT). The matter was quietly and secretly covered up, and few either inside or outside Russia were aware of the full scope of the disaster until 1980.

Before the 1957 accident, much of the waste was dumped into the Techa River, causing severe contamination and negatively affecting residents of dozens of riverside villages including Ozyorsk. After the 1957 accident, dumping in the Techa River officially ceased. In addition to the radioactive risks, the airborne lead and particulate soot levels in Ozyorsk (along with much of the Ural industrial region) are also very high—roughly equal to the levels encountered along busy roadsides in the era predating unleaded gasoline and catalytic converters—due to the presence of numerous lead smelters.

== Administrative and municipal status ==
Within the framework of administrative divisions, it has, together with six rural localities, official status as the Town of Ozyorsk—an administrative unit with a status equal to that of the districts. As a municipal division, the town of Ozyorsk has the official name Ozyorsky Urban Okrug.

== Economy ==
Ozyorsk has been closed because of its proximity to the Mayak plant, one of the sources of Soviet plutonium during the Cold War, and now a Russian facility for processing nuclear waste and recycling nuclear material from decommissioned nuclear weapons.

The town's coat of arms depicts a flame-colored salamander resting on a stylized reactor block (seen from above) submerged in water. Southern-Urals Construction Department (ЗАО "Южноуральское управление строительства") is another major enterprise. Its activities include construction for atomic industry needs, production of concrete constructions and construction materials.

== Education and culture ==
There are seventeen different cultural and public-service institutions. There are sixteen secondary schools, two schools specializing in the English language, one gymnasium, physics-mathematics lyceum, three professional colleges, Southern-Ural Polytechnical College, Music College, Ozyorsk Engineering Institute (an affiliate of National Research Nuclear University MEPhI), and affiliates of Yekaterinburg's and Chelyabinsk's universities.

== Documentary film ==
City 40 is a documentary film about the town, directed by Samira Goetschel and released in July 2016.
