= Techa =

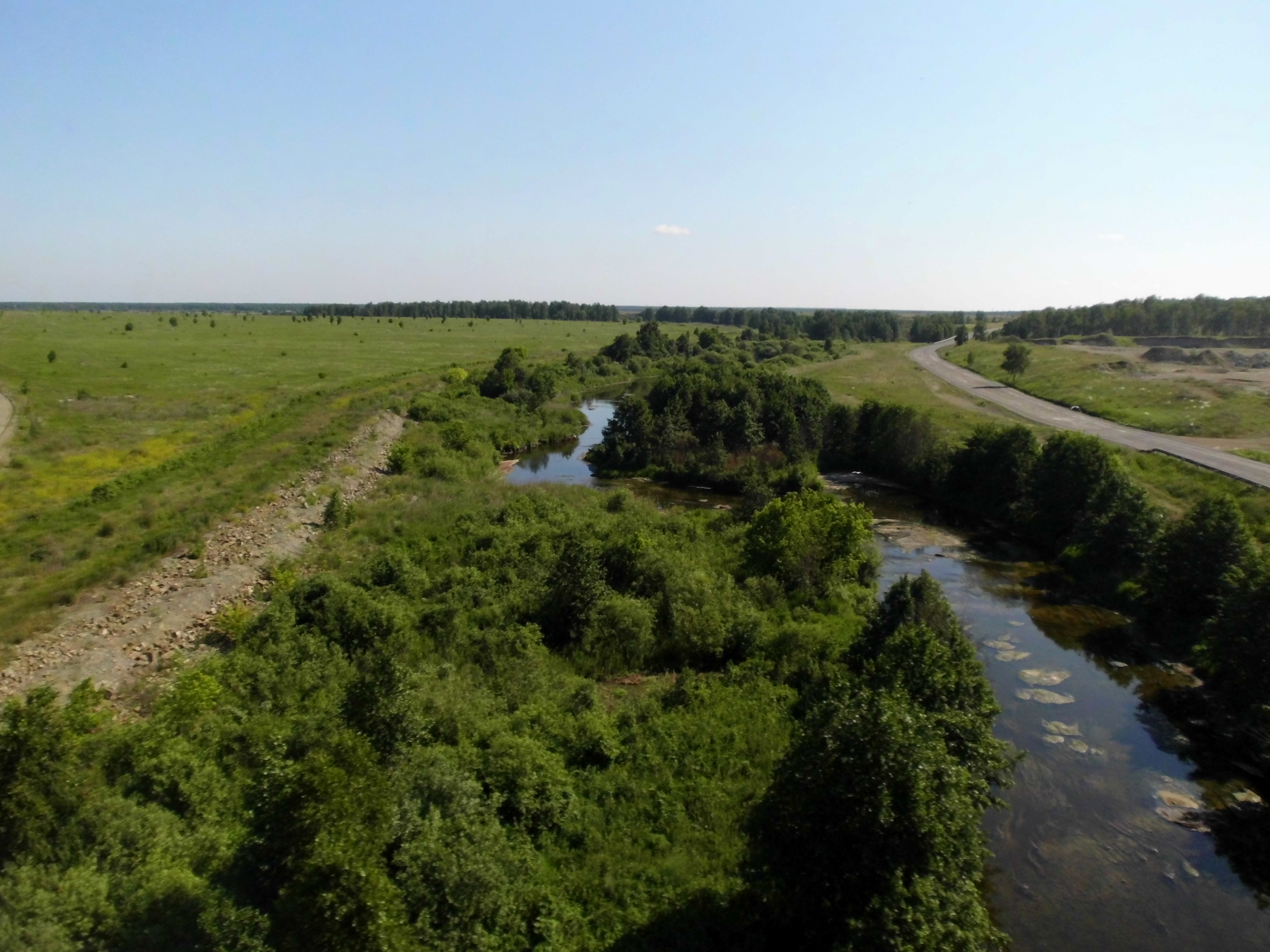

Location
- Country: Russia

Physical characteristics
- Mouth: Iset
  - coordinates: 55.7686°N 60.7339°E
- Length: 243 km (151 mi)
- Basin size: 7,600 km^{2} (2,900 sq mi)

Basin features
- Progression: Iset→ Tobol→ Irtysh→ Ob→ Kara Sea

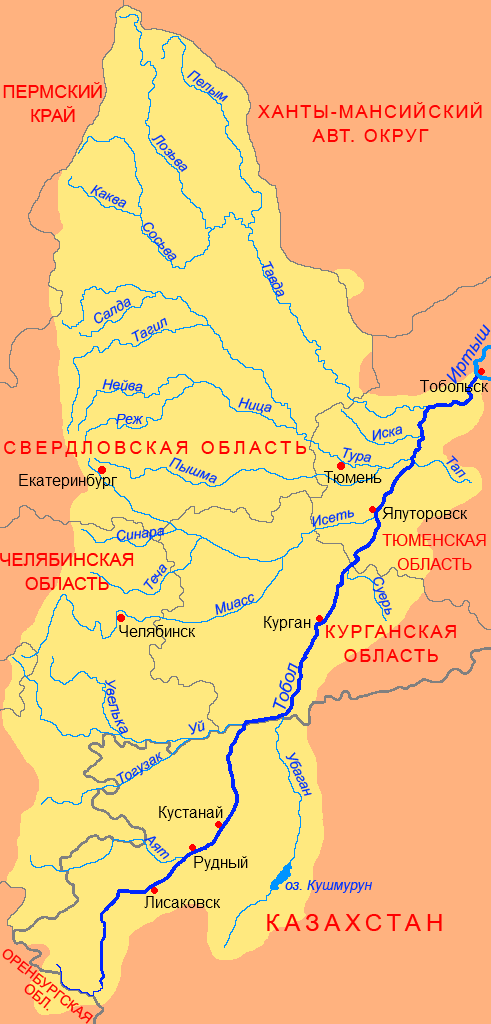
Map of the Tobol basin. The Techa river (Теча) may be found to the left center, next to the regional ЧЕЛЯБИНСКАЯ ОБЛАСТЬ (Chelyabinsk Oblast) label.

The Techa (Russian: Те́ча, [ˈtʲet͡ɕə]) is an eastward river on the eastern flank of the southern Ural Mountains noted for its nuclear contamination. It is 243 kilometres (151 mi) long, and its basin covers 7,600 square kilometres (2,900 mi^{2}). It begins by the once-secret nuclear processing town of Ozyorsk about 80 kilometres (50 mi) northwest of Chelyabinsk and flows east then northeast to the small town of Dalmatovo to flow into the mid-part of the Iset, a tributary of the Tobol. Its basin is close to and north of the Miass, longer than these rivers apart from the Tobol.

== Water pollution ==
From 1949 to 1956 the Mayak complex dumped an estimated 76 million cubic metres (2.7×10^{9} cu ft) of radioactive waste water into the Techa River, a cumulative dispersal of 2.75 MCi (102 PBq) of radioactivity.

As many as forty villages, with a combined population of about 28,000 residents, lined the river at the time. For 24 of them, the Techa was a major source of water; 23 of them were eventually evacuated. In the past 45 years, about half a million people in the region have been irradiated in one or more of the incidents, exposing them to as much as 20 times the radiation suffered by the Chernobyl disaster victims.

The Tobol is a sub-tributary of the Ob, being linked by the final part of the Irtysh; all three flow generally north.

== See also ==
- Pollution of Lake Karachay
- List of most-polluted rivers
- Water pollution
- Plutopia
- Ozyorsk, Chelyabinsk Oblast
- Semipalatinsk Test Site
