= Outline of nuclear power =

Overview of and topical guide to nuclear power

The following outline is provided as an overview of and topical guide to nuclear power:

Nuclear power – the use of sustained nuclear fission to generate heat and electricity. Nuclear power plants provide about 6% of the world's energy and 13–14% of the world's electricity, with the U.S., France, and Japan together accounting for about 50% of nuclear generated electricity.

== What type of thing is nuclear power? ==
Nuclear power can be described as all of the following:

- Nuclear technology (outline) – technology that involves the reactions of atomic nuclei. Among the notable nuclear technologies are nuclear power, nuclear medicine, and nuclear weapons. It has found applications from smoke detectors to nuclear reactors, and from gun sights to nuclear weapons.
- Electricity generation – the process of generating electric energy from other forms of energy. The fundamental principles of electricity generation were discovered during the 1820s and early 1830s by the British scientist Michael Faraday. His basic method is still used today: electricity is generated by the movement of a loop of wire, or disc of copper between the poles of a magnet.

== Science of nuclear power ==
- Nuclear engineering
- Nuclear chemistry
- Nuclear fission
- Nuclear physics
  - Atomic nucleus
  - Ionizing radiation
  - Nuclear fission
  - Radiation
  - Radioactivity
- Radioisotope thermoelectric generator
- Steam generator (nuclear power)

=== Nuclear material ===
Nuclear material

- Nuclear fuel
- Fertile material
- Thorium
- Uranium
- Enriched uranium
- Depleted uranium
- Plutonium
- Deuterium
- Tritium

=== Nuclear reactor technology ===
- Nuclear reactor technology
- Types of nuclear reactors
  - Advanced gas-cooled reactor
  - Boiling water reactor
  - Fast breeder reactor
  - Fast neutron reactor
  - Gas-cooled fast reactor
  - Generation IV reactor
  - Integral Fast Reactor
  - Lead-cooled fast reactor
  - Liquid-metal-cooled reactor
  - Magnox reactor
  - Molten salt reactor
  - Pebble bed reactor
  - Pressurized water reactor
  - Sodium-cooled fast reactor
  - Supercritical water reactor
  - Very high temperature reactor

== Dangers of nuclear power ==
- Lists of nuclear disasters and radioactive incidents
- Nuclear reactor accidents in the United States
- Radioactive waste
- Nuclear proliferation
- Nuclear terrorism
- Radioactive contamination

== Notable accidents ==
- 2011 Japanese nuclear accidents
- 1986 List of Chernobyl-related articles
- 1985 Soviet submarine K-431
- 1979 Three Mile Island accident
- 1968 Soviet submarine K-27
- 1961 Soviet submarine K-19

== History of nuclear power ==
History of nuclear power

- Atomic Energy Commission (disambiguation)
- History of uranium
- Lists of nuclear disasters and radioactive incidents
- United Nations Atomic Energy Commission (1946-1948)
- United States Atomic Energy Commission (1946-1974)
- Nuclear renaissance

== Nuclear power industry ==
- Environmental impact of nuclear power
- Nuclear renaissance
- Relative cost of electricity generated by different sources

=== Uranium mining ===
- Uranium mining debate
- Nuclear power plant

=== Uranium processing ===
- Isotope separation
  - Enriched uranium
- Nuclear reprocessing
  - Reprocessed uranium

=== Nuclear power plants ===
- Economics of new nuclear power plants
- Nuclear power plant emergency response team
- List of nuclear reactors
- Reactor building

==== Specific nuclear power plants ====
- List of nuclear power stations
- List of cancelled nuclear plants in the United States
- Baltic nuclear power plant (disambiguation)
- Belarusian nuclear power plant project
- Berkeley nuclear power station
- Bradwell nuclear power station
- Chapelcross nuclear power station
- Dodewaard nuclear power plant
- Heysham nuclear power station
- Hinkley Point A nuclear power station
- Hinkley Point C nuclear power station
- Hunterston A nuclear power station
- Hunterston B nuclear power station
- Russian floating nuclear power station
- Sizewell nuclear power stations
- Trawsfynydd nuclear power station

=== Nuclear waste ===
- High-level radioactive waste management
- List of nuclear waste treatment technologies

=== Nuclear power by region ===
- Nuclear power by country
- List of nuclear power accidents by country
- Nuclear power in Asia
  - Nuclear power in India
  - India's three stage nuclear power programme
  - Nuclear power in Indonesia
  - Nuclear power in Japan
  - Nuclear power in North Korea
  - Nuclear power in Pakistan
  - Nuclear power in South Korea
  - Nuclear power in Taiwan
  - Nuclear power in Thailand
  - Nuclear power in the People's Republic of China
  - Nuclear power in the Philippines
  - Nuclear power in the United Arab Emirates
- Nuclear power in Australia
- Nuclear power in Europe
  - Nuclear power in the European Union
  - Nuclear power in Albania
  - Nuclear power in Belarus
  - Nuclear power in Bulgaria
  - Nuclear power in the Czech Republic
  - Nuclear power in Finland
  - Nuclear power in France
  - Nuclear power in Germany
  - Nuclear power in Italy
  - Nuclear power in Romania
  - Nuclear power in Russia
  - Nuclear power in Scotland
  - Nuclear power in Spain
  - Nuclear power in Sweden
  - Nuclear power in Switzerland
- Nuclear power in Ukraine
- Nuclear power in the United Kingdom
- Nuclear power in North America
  - Nuclear power in Canada
  - Nuclear power in the United States
    - Nuclear power plants in New Jersey

=== Nuclear power companies ===
- Companies in the nuclear sector – list of all large companies which are active along the nuclear chain, from uranium mining, processing and enrichment, to the actual operating of nuclear power plant and waste processing.
  - BKW FMB Energie AG
  - ČEZ Group
  - China Guangdong Nuclear Power Group
  - China National Nuclear Corporation
  - China Nuclear International Uranium Corporation
  - E.ON
  - E.ON Kernkraft GmbH
  - E.ON Sverige
  - Electrabel
  - Électricité de France
  - Eletronuclear
  - Endesa (Spain)
  - Energoatom
  - Fennovoima
  - Fortum
  - Iberdrola
  - Korea Hydro & Nuclear Power
  - Bhavini
  - Nuclear Power Corporation of India
  - Nuclearelectrica
  - OKB Gidropress
  - Resun
  - Rosenergoatom
  - RWE
  - Unión Fenosa
  - Teollisuuden Voima
  - Vattenfall
  - Vattenfall Europe Nuclear Energy GmbH

=== Nuclear safety ===
- Nuclear safety
  - Event tree
    - Event tree analysis
  - Exclusion area
  - International Nuclear Safety Center
  - Nuclear power plant emergency response team
  - Reactor protection system
- Nuclear safety in the United States

== Nuclear power in space ==
- Nuclear power in space
- Advanced Stirling Radioisotope Generator

== Politics of nuclear power ==
- Alsos Digital Library for Nuclear Issues
- Anti-nuclear movement
- Anti-nuclear movement in Germany
- Anti-nuclear movement in the United States
- Anti-nuclear power movement in Japan
- Anti-nuclear protests
- Anti-nuclear protests in the United States
- Nuclear energy policy
- Nuclear power debate
- Nuclear power phase-out
- Nuclear power proposed as renewable energy
- Nuclear whistleblowers
- Nuclear renaissance
- Uranium mining debate

=== Politics of nuclear power by region ===
- 1978 Austrian nuclear power referendum
- 2008 Lithuanian nuclear power referendum
- 1980 Swedish nuclear power referendum

=== Nuclear regulatory agencies ===
- Association Nationale des Comités et Commissions Locales d'Information (France)
- Atomic Energy Regulatory Board (India)
- Autorité de sûreté nucléaire (France)
- Bangladesh Atomic Energy Commission
- Brazilian–Argentine Agency for Accounting and Control of Nuclear Materials
- Canadian Nuclear Safety Commission
- International Nuclear Regulators' Association
- Japanese Atomic Energy Commission
- Japanese Nuclear Safety Commission
- Nuclear and Industrial Safety Agency (Japan, retired)
- Nuclear Regulation Authority (Japan)
- Kernfysische dienst (The Netherlands)
- Nuclear Regulatory Commission (USA)
- Pakistan Nuclear Regulatory Authority
- Säteilyturvakeskus (Finland)

== Nuclear power organizations ==
See also Nuclear regulatory agencies, above

- Alsos Digital Library for Nuclear Issues
- International Nuclear Safety Center

=== Against ===
- Friends of the Earth International, a network of environmental organizations in 77 countries.
- Greenpeace International, a non-governmental environmental organization with offices in 41 countries.
- Nuclear Information and Resource Service (International)
- World Information Service on Energy (International)
- Sortir du nucléaire (France)
- Pembina Institute (Canada)
- Institute for Energy and Environmental Research (United States)
- Sayonara Nuclear Power Plants (Japan)

=== Supportive ===
Nuclear power groups

- World Nuclear Association, a confederation of companies connected with nuclear power production. (International)
- International Atomic Energy Agency (IAEA)
- Nuclear Energy Institute (United States)
- American Nuclear Society (United States)
- United Kingdom Atomic Energy Authority (United Kingdom)
- EURATOM (Europe)
- Atomic Energy of Canada Limited (Canada)
- Environmentalists for Nuclear Energy (International)

== Nuclear power publications ==
- Nuclear Power and the Environment
- Reaction Time: Climate Change and the Nuclear Option
- World Nuclear Industry Status Report
- In Mortal Hands

== Persons influential in nuclear power ==
- Scientists
  - Enrico Fermi – an American physicist
  - James Chadwick
- Politicians
  - Harry Truman
  - Ed Markey
  - Naoto Kan
  - Nobuto Hosaka
  - Angela Merkel
- Engineers
  - David Lochbaum
  - Arnold Gundersen
  - George Galatis

== See also ==
- Fusion power
- Future energy development
- German nuclear energy project
  - Inertial fusion power plant
- Linear no-threshold model
- Polywell
- World energy resources and consumption
