= Nuclear terrorism =

Terrorism involving nuclear material or weapons

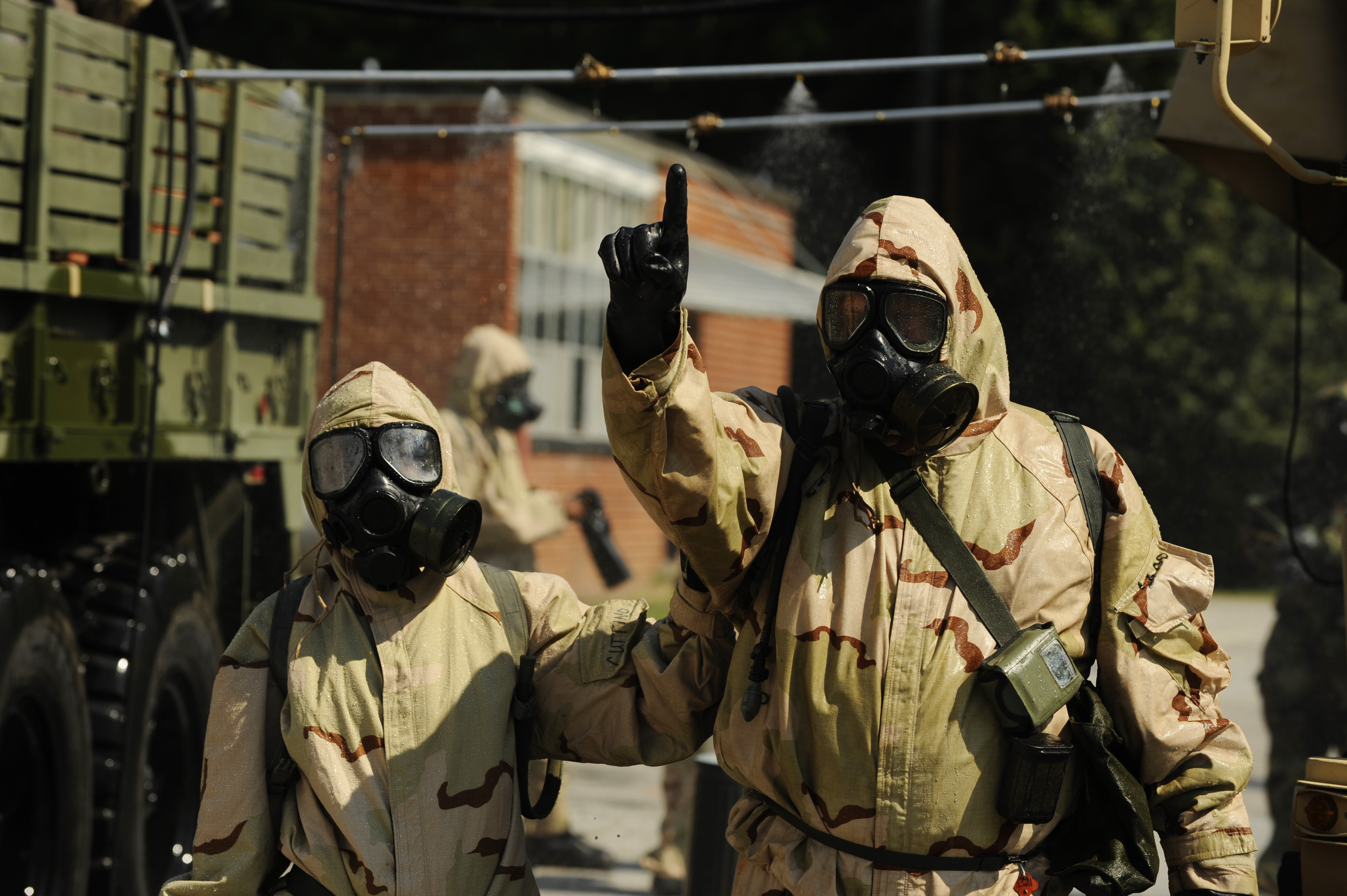
United States Army soldiers wearing NBC suits during a simulated nuclear terrorist attack training exercise in McCormick, South Carolina in 2011

Nuclear terrorism is the use of a nuclear weapon or radiological weapon as an act of terrorism. There are many possible terror incidents, ranging in feasibility and scope. These include the sabotage of a nuclear facility, the intentional irradiation of citizens, or the detonation of a radiological device, colloquially termed a dirty bomb, but consensus is lacking. According to the 2005 United Nations International Convention for the Suppression of Acts of Nuclear Terrorism nuclear terrorism is an offense committed if a person unlawfully and intentionally "uses in any way radioactive material … with the intent to cause death or serious bodily injury; or with the intent to cause substantial damage to property or to the environment; or with the intent to compel a natural or legal person, an international organization or a State to do or refrain from doing an act."

The possibility of terrorist organizations using nuclear weapons has been identified by nuclear powers and considered since the conception of nuclear weapons and the rise of global terrorism. Nuclear powers collaborate to prevent terror organizations from acquiring nuclear weapons and fuel.

It is considered plausible that terrorists could acquire a nuclear weapon. As such, countries such as China and the UK have taken steps to restrict access to nuclear weapons and materials. Restrictions being implemented are only a small part of prevention systems that are being researched in countries. Preventing nuclear terrorism is a topic that interests countries who are developing or expanding their nuclear warhead knowledge. Whether it be through policy, summits, or warhead detection and disablement, the idea of threatening another nation is a worry that comes with the notion of war. Nonetheless, despite thefts and trafficking of small amounts of fissile material, there is no credible evidence that any terrorist group has ever obtained or produced nuclear materials of sufficient quantity or purity to produce a viable nuclear weapon.

== Scope ==
Nuclear terrorism could include:

- Acquiring or fabricating a nuclear weapon
- Fabricating a dirty bomb
- Attacking a nuclear reactor, e.g., by disrupting critical inputs (e.g. water supply)
- Attacking or taking over a nuclear-armed submarine, plane, or base.

Nuclear terrorism, according to a 2011 report published by the Belfer Center for Science and International Affairs at Harvard University, can be executed and distinguished via four pathways:

- The use of a nuclear weapon that has been stolen or purchased on the black market
- The use of a crude explosive device built by terrorists or by nuclear scientists who the terrorist organization has furtively recruited
- The use of an explosive device constructed by terrorists and their accomplices using their own fissile material
- The acquisition of fissile material from a nation-state.

Former U.S. President Barack Obama called nuclear terrorism "the single most important national security threat that we face". In his first speech to the U.N. Security Council, President Obama stated that "Just one nuclear weapon exploded in a city—be it New York or Moscow, Tokyo or Beijing, London or Paris—could kill hundreds of thousands of people", and warned such an attack could "destabilize our security, our economies, and our very way of life".

== History ==
As early as December 1945, politicians worried about the possibility of smuggling nuclear weapons into the United States, though this was still in the context of a battle between the superpowers of the Cold War. Congressmen quizzed the "father of the atomic bomb", J. Robert Oppenheimer, about the possibility of detecting a smuggled atomic bomb:

Sen. Millikin: We... have mine-detecting devices, which are rather effective... I was wondering if anything of that kind might be available to use as a defense against that particular type of use of atomic bombs.
Dr. Oppenheimer: If you hired me to walk through the cellars of Washington to see whether there were atomic bombs, I think my most important tool would be a screwdriver to open the crates and look. I think that just walking by, swinging a little gadget would not give me the information.

This sparked further work on the question of smuggled atomic devices during the 1950s.

Discussions of non-state nuclear terrorism among experts go back at least to the 1970s. In 1975 The Economist warned that "You can make a bomb with a few pounds of plutonium. By the mid-1980s the power stations may easily be turning out 200,000 lb of the stuff each year. And each year, unless present methods are drastically changed, many thousands of pounds of it will be transferred from one plant to another as it proceeds through the fuel cycle. The dangers of robbery in transit are evident.... Vigorous co-operation between governments and the International Atomic Energy Agency could, even at this late stage, make the looming perils loom a good deal smaller." The New York Times commented in 1981 that The Nuclear Emergency Search Team's "origins go back to the aftershocks of the Munich Olympic massacre in mid-1972. Until that time, no one in the United States Government had thought seriously about the menace of organized, international terrorism, much less nuclear terrorism. There was a perception in Washington that the value of what is called 'special nuclear material' – plutonium or highly enriched uranium (HEU) – was so enormous that the strict financial accountability of the private contractors who dealt with it would be enough to protect it from falling into the wrong hands. But it has since been revealed that the physical safeguarding of bomb-grade material against theft was almost scandalously neglected."

This discussion took on a larger public character in the 1980s after NBC aired Special Bulletin, a television dramatization of a nuclear terrorist attack on the United States. In 1986 a private panel of experts known as the International Task Force on the Prevention of Terrorism released a report urging all nuclear-armed states to beware the dangers of terrorism and work on equipping their nuclear arsenals with permissive action links. "The probability of nuclear terrorism," the experts warned, "is increasing and the consequences for urban and industrial societies could be catastrophic."

== Acquisition ==
Nuclear weapons may be acquired by non-state organisations such as terrorist groups via purchase or theft, either in whole or in part, from state entities. State involvement may be either intentional—as an act of policy—or inadvertent—through failure to exercise sovereignty within their territory over nuclear weapons or materials with which to build them. Robert Litwak, vice-president of the Woodrow Wilson International Center for Scholars, deemed it unlikely that terrorist groups would be able to effectively create nuclear weapons without enriched uranium. Nevertheless, he speculated that ISIS's control over much of Syria and Iraq, and therefore much of their infrastructure, could lead to them developing "state-like WMD (weapons of mass destruction) capabilities". Litwak therefore stated that the United States's primary strategy had been to curtail ISIS's territorial gains to deny them the capabilities of a state.

In 2018, José Furtado conducted a thorough threat assessment on the intent and capability of a terrorist group to acquire a nuclear weapon and to use it against a western city, in the specific case, against Lisbon. Concerning the intent, he concluded that the use of nuclear weapons is a natural consequence in the unrestrained escalation that occurs whenever an existential fight between the absolute good (us) and the absolute evil (them) is going on, a typical mental frame of religious/eschatological terrorist groups. This unrestrained escalation was already foreseen and planned by three religious/eschatological terrorist groups in recent years: Aum Shinrikyo, Al-Qaeda and the Islamic State of Iraq and Syria (ISIS). Concerning the capability of a terrorist group to build a nuclear weapon, he concludes that the scenario of the provision of nuclear fuel Uranium-235 (^{235}U) or Plutonium-239 (^{239}Pu) by a nuclear nation is probable under certain security and strategic conditions, while the theft of a complete nuclear weapon is also possible in countries like Pakistan, with a high degree of fundamentalist extremism engrained across the whole society, able to infiltrate and subvert any security system, from bottom to top.

== Prevention ==
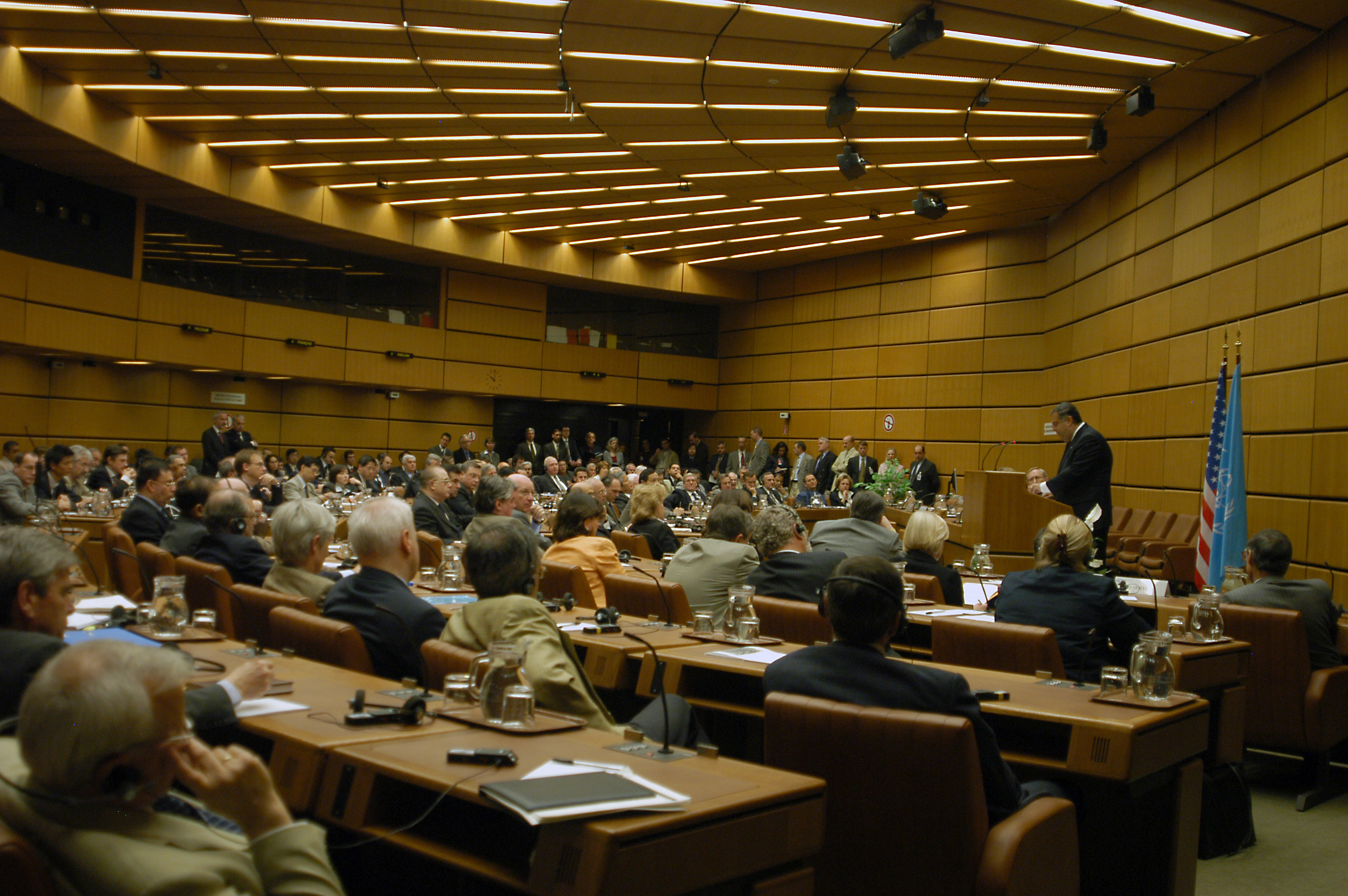
The announcement of the United States' Global Threat Reduction Initiative at the International Atomic Energy Agency's headquarters in Vienna, Austria in 2004

Unlike state-level use of nuclear weapons, retaliation is not likely to deter terrorist groups from the use of nuclear weapons, so the doctrine of mutually assured destruction does not apply.

Denial of access to nuclear materials is thus the approach taken by interested nations. Techniques include import and export restrictions, physical security at nuclear facilities to prevent theft, and consolidation or elimination of stockpiles to reduce the security perimeter. The United States subsidizes security for nuclear materials and dismantlement of nuclear weapons through the Cooperative Threat Reduction and Global Threat Reduction Initiative programs.

Different countries have their own proposals for how to secure nuclear materials. In China, during 2020 there was a proposal for security measures to be developed surrounding radioactive material transportation. Similarly, the UK had an approach in 2021. A UK review was published surrounding the use of radiation detection systems with shipping container cargo, and how future systems should be designed as to implement improved detection technologies without negatively impacting the shipping industry.

Efforts to secure nuclear materials are also made by threatening to punish any country that uses, sells, or gives away nuclear weapons or materials. One example of this is when U.S. President George W. Bush threatened North Korea with consequences if they were to engage in such behavior.

=== Organizations to combat nuclear terrorism ===
The Global Initiative to Combat Nuclear Terrorism (GICNT) is an international partnership of 88 nations and 5 official observers working to improve capacity on a national and international level for prevention, detection, and response to a nuclear terrorist event. Partners join the GICNT by endorsing the Statement of Principles, a set of broad nuclear security objectives. GICNT partner nations organize and host workshops, conferences, and exercises to share best practices for implementing the Statement of Principles. The GICNT also holds Plenary meetings to discuss improvements and changes to the partnership.

The World Institute for Nuclear Security is an organization which seeks to prevent nuclear terrorism and improve world nuclear security. It works alongside the International Atomic Energy Agency. WINS was formed in 2008, less than a year after a break-in at the Pelindaba nuclear facility in South Africa, which contained enough enriched uranium to make several nuclear bombs.

== Physical and human impacts - a nuclear terrorism attack simulation ==
The impact of a nuclear explosion on a city would be catastrophic, causing death and injury to thousands of people and the destruction of the urban infrastructure. In a paper published in 2021, José Furtado discusses the results of a nuclear terrorism attack simulation, examining in more detail the human and physical impact of an attack on the city of Lisbon. His approach involved analysing quantitative results obtained through the Nukemap program, which simulates the physical reality of a nuclear explosion, applying it to the Lisbon region. By combining these quantitative results with the analysis of other information relating to the strategic bombing of Germany during World War II, the atomic bombings of Hiroshima and Nagasaki, some of the nuclear weapons tests conducted during the Cold War, and other related research, it was possible to conclude that, for the tested scenario — the surface burst of a nuclear weapon with a 40 kt yield — this impact would result in the complete destruction of the city's human and economic core. The city's infrastructure would be completely destroyed: water supply, sanitation, electricity grid, gas distribution, telecommunications, public transportation, hospitals and healthcare facilities, food supply chain, commercial and industrial facilities, among others, as well as thousands of buildings across an area of 50 km², resulting in the death of over 96,000 people and injuring more than 168,000. Of these 168,000 injured, most would suffer multiple severe injuries, such as burns, bone fractures, and acute radiation syndrome, significantly reducing their chances of survival, even with advanced medical care. Also, the sheer number of simultaneous injuries would make it impossible to provide adequate medical care, as the national healthcare system would be overwhelmed. In the scenario presented in this study, contamination from nuclear fallout would extend beyond the city limits, contaminating a vast area of the Setúbal Peninsula.

== Militant groups ==
Nuclear weapons materials on the black market are a global concern, and there is concern about the possible detonation of a small, crude nuclear weapon by a militant group in a major city, with significant loss of life and property.

It is feared that a terrorist group could detonate a dirty bomb, a type of radiological weapon. A dirty bomb is made of any radioactive source and a conventional explosive. There would be no nuclear blast and likely no fatalities, but the radioactive material is dispersed and can cause extensive fallout depending on the material used. There are other radiological weapons called radiological exposure devices where an explosive is not necessary. A radiological weapon may be very appealing to terrorist groups as it is highly successful in instilling fear and panic among a population (particularly because of the threat of radiation poisoning) and would contaminate the immediate area for some period of time, disrupting attempts to repair the damage and subsequently inflicting significant economic losses.

=== Al-Qaeda ===
From its foundation in 1988, al-Qaeda had a military subcommittee on nuclear weapons and tried to purchase fissile material from former Soviet Union and its former satellite states. After al-Qaeda merged with Ayman al-Zawahiri's Egyptian Islamic Jihad the new Shura Council held internal discussions on nuclear weapons, and in 1998 Osama bin Laden issued a fatwa declaring that it was his religious duty to acquire and use nuclear weapons. Al-Qaeda defector Jamal al-Fadl told the FBI that bin Laden paid a Sudanese Armed Forces general $1.5 million for a cylinder of cinnabar which he believed contained South African uranium in 1993. In April 2001, a Bulgarian businessman claimed bin Laden offered to buy fissile material from him in a meeting near the China-Pakistan border.

In bin Laden's only interview with a journalist after the September 11 attacks, he and al-Zawahiri claimed that al-Qaeda possessed readily usable chemical and nuclear weapons. It is generally believed, including by the interviewer Hamid Mir, that they were bluffing and that it would have been extremely unlikely for al-Qaeda to have procured weapons of mass destruction at that time.

According to Bunn & Wier, bin Laden requested a ruling (a fatwa), and was subsequently informed via a cleric of Saudi Arabia during 2003, of it being in accordance with Islamic law for him to use a nuclear device against civilians if it was the only course of action available to him in a situation of defending Muslims against the actions of the U.S. military.

According to leaked diplomatic documents, al-Qaeda can produce radiological weapons, after sourcing nuclear material and recruiting rogue scientists to build "dirty bombs". Al-Qaeda, along with some North Caucasus terrorist groups that seek to establish an Islamic Caliphate in Russia, have consistently stated they seek nuclear weapons and have tried to acquire them. Al-Qaeda has sought nuclear weapons for almost two decades by attempting to purchase stolen nuclear material and weapons and has sought nuclear expertise on numerous occasions. Osama bin Laden stated that the acquisition of nuclear weapons or other weapons of mass destruction is a “religious duty.” While pressure from a wide range of counter-terrorist activity has hampered Al-Qaeda's ability to manage such a complex project, there is no sign that it has jettisoned its goals of acquiring fissile material. Statements made as recently as 2008 indicate that Al-Qaeda's nuclear ambitions are still very strong.

=== Islamic State ===
The Islamic State of Iraq and Syria (ISIS) has demonstrated ambition to use weapons of mass destruction. Although the chances of them obtaining a nuclear bomb are small, the group has been trying/suspected of trying to obtain a nuclear dirty bomb. In July 2014, after the fall of Mosul, ISIS militants captured nuclear materials from Mosul University. In a letter to UN Secretary-General Ban Ki-moon, Iraq's UN Ambassador Mohamed Ali Alhakim said that the materials had been kept at the university and "can be used in manufacturing weapons of mass destruction". International Atomic Energy Agency spokeswoman Gill Tudor said that the seized materials were "low grade and would not present a significant safety, security or nuclear proliferation risk".

In October 2015, it was reported that Moldovan authorities working with the FBI had stopped four attempts from 2010 to 2015 by gangs with suspected connections to Russia's intelligence services that sought to sell radioactive material to ISIS and other Middle Eastern extremists. The last reported case came in February 2015 when a smuggler with a large amount of radioactive caesium specifically sought a buyer from ISIS. Due to poor relations between Russia and the West, it is difficult to ascertain if smugglers succeeded in selling radioactive material originating from Russia to Islamist terrorists and elsewhere.

In March 2016, it was reported that a senior Belgian nuclear official was being monitored by ISIS suspects linked to the November 2015 Paris attacks leading the Belgian Federal Agency for Nuclear Control to suspect that ISIS was planning on abducting the official to obtain nuclear materials for a dirty bomb.

In April 2016, European Union and NATO security chiefs warned that ISIS was plotting to carry out nuclear attacks on the United Kingdom and Europe.

=== North Caucasus terrorists ===
North Caucasus terrorists have attempted to seize a nuclear-powered and nuclear-armed ballistic missile submarine. They have also engaged in reconnaissance activities on nuclear storage facilities and have repeatedly threatened to sabotage nuclear facilities. Similar to Al-Qaeda, these groups’ activities have been hampered by counter-terrorism activity; nevertheless they remain committed to launching such a devastating attack within Russia.

=== Aum Shinrikyo ===
The Japanese terror cult Aum Shinrikyo, which used sarin gas in the 1995 Tokyo Metro attack, has also tried to acquire nuclear weapons. However, according to nuclear terrorism researchers at Harvard University’s Belfer Center for Science and International Affairs, there is no evidence as of 2011 that they continue to do so.

== Incidents involving nuclear material ==
Information reported to the International Atomic Energy Agency (IAEA) shows "a persistent problem with the illicit trafficking in nuclear and other radioactive materials, thefts, losses and other unauthorized activities". The IAEA Illicit Nuclear Trafficking Database notes 1,266 incidents reported by 99 countries over the last 12 years, including 18 incidents involving HEU or plutonium trafficking:

- There have been 18 incidents of theft or loss of highly enriched uranium (HEU) and plutonium confirmed by the IAEA.
- British academic Shaun Gregory alleged in 2009 that terrorists had attacked Pakistani nuclear facilities three times; twice in 2007 and once in 2008. However, the then Director General ISPR Athar Abbas said the claims were "factually incorrect", adding that the sites were "military facilities, not nuclear installations".
- In November 2007, burglars with unknown intentions infiltrated the Pelindaba nuclear research facility near Pretoria, South Africa. The burglars escaped without acquiring any of the uranium held at the facility.
- In June 2007, the Federal Bureau of Investigation released to the press the name of Adnan Gulshair el Shukrijumah, allegedly the operations leader for developing tactical plans for detonating nuclear bombs in several American cities simultaneously.
- In November 2006, MI5 warned that al-Qaeda were planning on using nuclear weapons against cities in the United Kingdom by obtaining the bombs via clandestine means.
- In February 2006, Oleg Khinsagov of Russia was arrested in Georgia, along with three Georgian accomplices, with 79.5 grams of 89 percent HEU.
- In November 2006, the Alexander Litvinenko poisoning with radioactive polonium "represents an ominous landmark: the beginning of an era of nuclear terrorism," according to Andrew J. Patterson.
- In June 2002, U.S. citizen José Padilla was arrested for allegedly planning a radiological attack on the city of Chicago; however, he was never charged with such conduct. He was instead convicted of charges that he conspired to "murder, kidnap and maim" people overseas.

== By country ==
=== Pakistan ===
In 2009, a paper published in West Point Military Academy's journal alleged that Pakistan's nuclear sites had been attacked by al-Qaeda and the Taliban at least three times. The Pakistan Armed Forces rejected the allegations. Talat Masood, a political analyst, said that the nuclear link was "absolute nonsense". All three attacks were suicide and appeared to aim at causing maximum damage and not seizing weapons. In January 2010, it was revealed that the US army was training a specialised unit "to seal off and snatch back" Pakistani nuclear weapons in the event that militants would obtain a nuclear device or materials that could make one. Pakistan supposedly possesses about 160+ nuclear warheads. US officials refused to speak on the record about the American safety plans.

A study by the Belfer Center for Science and International Affairs at Harvard University titled "Securing the Bomb 2010," found that Pakistan's stockpile "faces a greater threat from Islamic terror groups seeking nuclear weapons than any other nuclear stockpile on earth." In 2016, Defense Intelligence Agency Director Vincent R. Stewart said that Pakistan "continues to take steps to improve its nuclear security, and is aware of the threat presented by extremists to its program".

According to Rolf Mowatt-Larssen, a former investigator with the CIA and the U.S. Department of Energy, there is "a greater possibility of a nuclear meltdown in Pakistan than anywhere else in the world. The region has more violent extremists than any other, the country is unstable, and its arsenal of nuclear weapons is expanding." In 2015, White House press secretary Josh Earnest said that the US has confidence that Pakistan is "well aware of the range of potential threats to its nuclear arsenal". He added that the US is "confident that Pakistan has a professional and dedicated security force that understands the importance and the high priority that the world places on nuclear security".

Nuclear weapons expert David Albright and author of "Peddling Peril" has also expressed concerns that Pakistan's stockpile may not be secure despite assurances by both Pakistan and U.S. government. He stated that Pakistan "has had many leaks from its program of classified information and sensitive nuclear equipment, and so you have to worry that it could be acquired in Pakistan". In 2015, Richard G. Olson, former US Ambassador to Pakistan, expressed confidence in the capabilities of the Pakistani security forces to control and secure its nuclear weapons. He added that Islamabad has "specifically taken into account the insider threat".

A 2016 study by the Congressional Research Service titled 'Pakistan's Nuclear Weapons', noted that Pakistan's "initiatives, such as strengthened export control laws, improved personnel security, and international nuclear security cooperation programs, have improved Pakistan's nuclear security".

=== Azerbaijan ===
During the 2020 Armenian–Azerbaijani skirmishes Azerbaijan threatened to launch missile attacks on the Armenian Nuclear Power Plant.

=== Iran ===
The Islamic Revolutionary Guard Corps Nuclear Protection and Security Corps is responsible for securing the Iranian nuclear program from terrorists.

=== Russia ===
The assassination of Alexander Litvinenko by Russian state agents in 2006 using the radioactive polonium was described as the beginning of an era of nuclear terrorism.

During the 2022 Russian invasion of Ukraine, Russian troops engaged in the Battle of Enerhodar began shelling the Zaporizhzhia Nuclear Power Plant on March 3, 2022. Units 2 and 3 were put into an emergency safe mode, while Unit 4 remained in operation due to being the furthest from the artillery firing range. Ukrainian Foreign Minister Dmytro Kuleba had warned that potential damage from a Russian attack would be "ten times larger than Chernobyl". The attack caused significant damage to the plant, including a fire breaking out near Unit 1, which was under maintenance at the time. The fire was contained in the following morning. The attack was condemned by many within the international community, including being described as nuclear terrorism by Lithuanian President Nauseda, "incredible reckless and dangerous" by US Ambassador to the UN Linda Thomas-Greenfield, and a war crime by Secretary General of NATO Jens Stoltenberg.

In August 2022 Dmitry Medvedev published a comment warning that "accidents can happen at European nuclear plants too", which was widely interpreted as a concealed threat.

=== United States ===
While in office, President Barack Obama reviewed Homeland Security policy and concluded that "attacks using improvised nuclear devices ... pose a serious and increasing national security risk". In their presidential contest, President George W. Bush and Senator John Kerry both agreed that the most serious danger facing the United States is the possibility that terrorists could obtain a nuclear bomb. Most nuclear-weapon analysts agree that "building such a device would pose few technological challenges to reasonably competent terrorists". The main barrier is acquiring highly enriched uranium.

In 2004, Graham Allison, U.S. Assistant Secretary of Defense during the Clinton administration, wrote that “on the current path, a nuclear terrorist attack on America in the decade ahead is more likely than not". In 2004, Bruce Blair, president of the Center for Defense Information stated: "I wouldn't be at all surprised if nuclear weapons are used over the next 15 or 20 years, first and foremost by a terrorist group that gets its hands on a Russian nuclear weapon or a Pakistani nuclear weapon". In 2006, Robert Galluccii, Dean of the Georgetown University School of Foreign Service, estimated that, “it is more likely than not that al-Qaeda or one of its affiliates will detonate a nuclear weapon in a U.S. city within the next five to ten years." Despite a number of claims, there is no credible evidence that any terrorist group has yet succeeded in obtaining a nuclear bomb or the materials needed to make one.

Detonation of a nuclear weapon in a major U.S. city could kill more than 500,000 people and cause more than a trillion dollars in damage. Hundreds of thousands could die from fallout, the resulting fires and collapsing buildings. In this scenario, uncontrolled fires would burn for days and emergency services and hospitals would be completely overwhelmed. The likely socio-economic consequences in the United States outside the immediate vicinity of an attack, and possibly in other countries, would also likely be far-reaching. A Rand Corporation report speculates that there may be an exodus from other urban centers by populations fearful of another nuclear attack.

The Obama administration claimed to focus on reducing the risk of high-consequence, non-traditional nuclear threats. Nuclear security was thought to be strengthened by enhancing "nuclear detection architecture and ensuring that our own nuclear materials are secure," and by "establishing well-planned, well-rehearsed, plans for co-ordinated response." According to senior Pentagon officials, the United States will make "thwarting nuclear-armed terrorists a central aim of American strategic nuclear planning." Nuclear attribution is another strategy being pursued to counter terrorism. Led by the National Technical Nuclear Forensics Center, attribution would allow the government to determine the likely source of nuclear material used in the event of a nuclear attack. This would prevent terrorist groups, and any states willing to help them, from being able to pull off a covert attack without assurance of retaliation.

In July 2010 medical personnel from the U.S. Army practiced the techniques they would use to treat people injured by an atomic blast. The exercises were carried out at a training center in Indiana, and were set up to "simulate the aftermath of a small nuclear bomb blast, set off in a U.S. city by terrorists."

Stuxnet is a computer worm discovered in June 2010 that is believed to have been created by the United States and Israel to attack the nuclear facilities of Iran and North Korea.

==== Nuclear power plants ====
After 9/11, nuclear power plants were to be prepared for an attack by a large, well-armed terrorist group. But the Nuclear Regulatory Commission, in revising its security rules, decided not to require that plants be able to defend themselves against groups carrying sophisticated weapons. According to a study by the Government Accountability Office, the N.R.C. appeared to have based its revised rules "on what the industry considered reasonable and feasible to defend against rather than on an assessment of the terrorist threat itself". If terrorist groups could sufficiently damage safety systems to cause a core meltdown at a nuclear power plant, and/or sufficiently damage spent fuel pools, such an attack could lead to widespread radioactive contamination. The Federation of American Scientists have said that if nuclear power use is to expand significantly, nuclear facilities will have to be made extremely safe from attacks that could release massive quantities of radioactivity into the community. New reactor designs have features of passive safety, which may help. In the United States, the NRC carries out "Force on Force" (FOF) exercises at all Nuclear Power Plant (NPP) sites at least once every three years.

The peace group Plowshares have shown how nuclear weapons facilities can be penetrated, and the groups actions represent extraordinary breaches of security at nuclear weapons plants in the United States. The National Nuclear Security Administration has acknowledged the seriousness of the 2012 Plowshares action. Non-proliferation policy experts have questioned "the use of private contractors to provide security at facilities that manufacture and store the government's most dangerous military material".

==== Hoaxes ====
In late 1974, President Gerald Ford was warned that the FBI received a communication from an extortionist wanting $200,000 ($1,300,000 today) after claiming that a nuclear weapon had been placed somewhere in Boston. A team of experts rushed in from the United States Atomic Energy Commission but their radiation detection gear arrived at a different airport. Federal officials then rented a fleet of vans to carry concealed radiation detectors around the city but forgot to bring the tools they needed to install the equipment. The incident was later found to be a hoax. However, the government's response made clear the need for an agency capable of effectively responding to such threats in the future. Later that year, President Ford created the Nuclear Emergency Search Team (NEST), which under the Atomic Energy Act is tasked with investigating the "illegal use of nuclear materials within the United States, including terrorist threats involving the use of special nuclear materials".

One of its first responses by the Nuclear Emergency Search/Support Team was in Spokane, Washington on November 23, 1976. An unknown group called the "Days of Omega" had mailed an extortion threat claiming it would explode radioactive containers of water all over the city unless paid $500,000 ($2,800,000 today). Presumably, the radioactive containers had been stolen from the Hanford Site, less than 150 miles to the southwest. Immediately, NEST flew in a support aircraft from Las Vegas and began searching for non-natural radiation, but found nothing. No one ever responded despite the elaborate instructions given, or made any attempt to claim the (fake) money which was kept under surveillance. Within days, the incident was deemed a hoax, though the case was never solved. To avoid panic, the public was not notified until a few years later.

== Policy landscape ==
=== Recovery ===
The Cooperative Threat Reduction Program (CTR), which is also known as the Nunn–Lugar Cooperative Threat Reduction, is a 1992 law sponsored by Senators Sam Nunn and Richard Lugar. The CTR established a program that gave the U.S. Department of Defense a direct stake in securing loose fissile material inside the since-dissolved Soviet Union. According to Graham Allison, director of Harvard University's Belfer Center for Science and International Affairs, this law is a major reason why not a single nuclear weapon has been discovered outside the control of Russia's nuclear custodians. The Belfer Center is itself running the Project on Managing the Atom, Matthew Bunn is a co-principal investigator of the project, Martin B. Malin is its executive director (circa. 2014).

In August 2002, the United States launched a program to track and secure enriched uranium from 24 Soviet-style reactors in 16 countries, in order to reduce the risk of the materials falling into the hands of terrorists or "rogue states". The first such operation was Project Vinca, "a multinational, public-private effort to remove nuclear material from a poorly-secured Yugoslav research institute." The project has been hailed as "a nonproliferation success story" with the "potential to inform broader 'global cleanout' efforts to address one of the weakest links in the nuclear nonproliferation chain: insufficiently secured civilian nuclear research facilities."

In 2004, the U.S. Global Threat Reduction Initiative (GTRI) was established in order to consolidate nuclear stockpiles of highly enriched uranium (HEU), plutonium, and assemble nuclear weapons at fewer locations. Additionally, the GTRI converted HEU fuels to low-enriched uranium (LEU) fuels, which has prevented their use in making a nuclear bomb within a short amount of time. HEU that has not been converted to LEU has been shipped back to secure sites, while amplified security measures have taken hold around vulnerable nuclear facilities.

=== Options ===
Robert Gallucci, President of the John D. and Catherine T. MacArthur Foundation, argues that traditional deterrence is not an effective approach toward terrorist groups bent on causing a nuclear catastrophe. Henry Kissinger, stating the wide availability of nuclear weapons makes deterrence “decreasingly effective and increasingly hazardous.” Preventive strategies, which advocate the elimination of an enemy before it is able to mount an attack, are risky and controversial, therefore difficult to implement. Gallucci believes that “the United States should instead consider a policy of expanded deterrence, which focuses not on the would-be nuclear terrorists but on those states that may deliberately transfer or inadvertently lead nuclear weapons and materials to them. By threatening retaliation against those states, the United States may be able to deter that which it cannot physically prevent.”.

Graham Allison makes a similar case, arguing that the key to expanded deterrence is coming up with ways of tracing nuclear material to the country that forged the fissile material. “After a nuclear bomb detonates, nuclear forensic cops would collect debris samples and send them to a laboratory for radiological analysis. By identifying unique attributes of the fissile material, including its impurities and contaminants, one could trace the path back to its origin.” The process is analogous to identifying a criminal by fingerprints. “The goal would be twofold: first, to deter leaders of nuclear states from selling weapons to terrorists by holding them accountable for any use of their own weapons; second, to give every leader the incentive to tightly secure their nuclear weapons and materials.”

=== Skepticism towards the possibility of nuclear terrorism ===
John Mueller, a scholar of international relations at the Ohio State University, is a prominent nuclear skeptic. He makes three claims: (1) the nuclear intent and capability of terrorist groups such as Al Qaeda has been “fundamentally exaggerated;” (2) “the likelihood a terrorist group will come up with an atomic bomb seems to be vanishingly small;” and (3) policymakers are guilty of an “atomic obsession” that has led to “substantively counterproductive” policies premised on “worst case fantasies.” In his book Atomic Obsession: Nuclear Alarmism from Hiroshima to Al-Qaeda he argues that: "anxieties about terrorists obtaining nuclear weapons are essentially baseless: a host of practical and organizational difficulties make their likelihood of success almost vanishingly small".

Intelligence officials have pushed back, testifying before Congress that the inability to recognize the shifting modus operandi of terrorist groups was part of the reason why members of Aum Shinrikyo, for example, were “not on anybody’s radar screen.” Matthew Bunn, associate professor at Harvard University's John F. Kennedy School of Government, argues that “Theft of HEU and plutonium is not a hypothetical worry, it is an ongoing reality." Almost all of the stolen HEU and plutonium that has been seized over the years had never been missed before it was seized. The IAEA Illicit Nuclear Trafficking Database notes 1,266 incidents reported by 99 countries over the last 12 years, including 18 incidents involving HEU or plutonium trafficking.

Keir Lieber and Daryl Press argue that despite the prominent U.S. focus on nuclear terrorism, "the fear of terrorist transfer [of nuclear weapons] seems greatly exaggerated... [and] the dangers of a state giving nuclear weapons to terrorists have been overstated." A decade of terrorism statistics show a strong correlation between attack fatalities and the attribution of the attack, and Lieber and Press assert that "neither a terror group nor a state sponsor would remain anonymous after a nuclear terror attack." About 75 percent of attacks with 100 or more fatalities were traced to the culprits; also, 97 percent of attacks on U.S. soil or that of a major ally (resulting in 10 or more deaths) were attributed to the guilty party. Lieber and Press conclude that the lack of anonymity would deter a state from providing terrorist groups with nuclear weapons.

The use of HEU and plutonium in satellites has raised the concern that a sufficiently motivated rogue state could retrieve materials from a satellite crash (notably on land as occurred with Kosmos-954, Mars-96 and Fobos-Grunt) and then use these to supplement the yield of an already working nuclear device. This has been discussed recently in the UN and the Nuclear Emergency Search Team regularly consults with Roscosmos and NASA about satellite re-entries that may have contained such materials. As yet no parts were verifiably recovered from Mars 96 but recent WikiLeaks releases suggest that one of the "cells" may have been recovered by mountain climbers in Chile.

=== Security summits ===
On April 12–13, 2010, President of the United States Barack Obama initiated and hosted the first-ever nuclear security summit in Washington D.C., commonly known as the Washington Nuclear Security Summit. The goal was to strengthen international cooperation to prevent nuclear terrorism. President Obama, along with nearly fifty world leaders, discussed the threat of nuclear terrorism, what steps needed to be taken to mitigate illicit nuclear trafficking, and how to secure nuclear material. The Summit was successful in that it produced a consensus delineating nuclear terrorism as a serious threat to all nations. Finally, the Summit produced over four-dozen specific actions embodied in commitments by individual countries and the Joint Work Plan. However, world leaders at the Summit failed to agree on baseline protections for weapons-usable material, and no agreement was reached on ending the use of highly enriched uranium (HEU) in civil nuclear functions. Many of the shortcomings of the Washington Nuclear Security Summit were addressed at the Seoul Nuclear Security Summit in March 2012, including a focus on nuclear detection.

According to Graham Allison, director of Harvard University’s Belfer Center for Science and International Affairs, the objectives of the Nuclear Security Summit in Seoul are to continue to, “assess the progress made since the Washington Summit and propose additional cooperation measures to (1) Combat the threat of nuclear terrorism, (2) protect nuclear materials and related facilities, and (3) prevent illicit trafficking in nuclear materials."

== Media coverage ==
In 2011, the British news agency, The Telegraph, received leaked documents regarding the Guantanamo Bay interrogations of Khalid Sheikh Mohammed. The documents cited Khalid saying that, if Osama bin Laden is captured or killed by the Coalition of the Willing, an al-Qaeda sleeper cell will detonate a "weapon of mass destruction" in a "secret location" in Europe, and promised it would be "a nuclear hellstorm". No such attack occurred after the killing of Osama bin Laden in 2011.

== See also ==
- The Apollo Affair - allegations of theft of HEU from the US' NUMEC facility by Israel; losses later recovered from pipes in facility and additional large amounts were lost after alleged theft was discovered and security enhanced.
- 2014 Nuclear Security Summit
- Atomic spies
- Crimes involving radioactive substances
- Guantanamo Bay files leak
- List of CBRN warfare forces
- Lists of nuclear disasters and radioactive incidents
- Mutual assured destruction
- Nuclear blackmail
- Nuclear espionage
- Nuclear power phase-out
- Nuclear warfare
- Superphénix
- Vulnerability of nuclear plants to attack
- War on terror
