= Outline of nuclear technology =

Overview of and topical guide to nuclear technology

The following outline is provided as an overview of and topical guide to nuclear technology:

Nuclear technology involves the reactions of atomic nuclei. Among the notable nuclear technologies are nuclear power, nuclear medicine, and nuclear weapons. It has found applications from smoke detectors to nuclear reactors, and from gun sights to nuclear weapons.

== Essence of nuclear technology ==
- Atomic nucleus

== Branches of nuclear technology ==
- Nuclear engineering

== History of nuclear technology ==
- History of nuclear power

== Nuclear material ==
- Nuclear fuel
- Fertile material
- Thorium
- Uranium
- Enriched uranium
- Depleted uranium
- Plutonium
- Deuterium
- Tritium

== Nuclear power ==
Nuclear power –

- List of nuclear power stations
- Nuclear reactor technology
  - Fusion power
  - Inertial fusion power plant
  - Reactor types
    - List of nuclear reactors
    - Advanced gas-cooled reactor
    - Boiling water reactor
    - Fast breeder reactor
    - Fast neutron reactor
    - Gas-cooled fast reactor
    - Generation IV reactor
    - Integral Fast Reactor
    - Lead-cooled fast reactor
    - Liquid-metal-cooled reactor
    - Magnox reactor
    - Molten-salt reactor
    - Pebble-bed reactor
    - Pressurized water reactor
    - Sodium-cooled fast reactor
    - Supercritical water reactor
    - Very high temperature reactor
- Radioisotope thermoelectric generator
- Radioactive waste
- Future energy development
- Nuclear propulsion
- Nuclear thermal rocket
- Polywell
- Nuclear decommissioning
- Nuclear power phase-out

=== Civilian nuclear accidents ===
- List of civilian nuclear accidents
- List of civilian radiation accidents

== Nuclear medicine ==
Nuclear medicine –

- BNCT
- Brachytherapy
- Gamma (Anger) Camera
- PET
- Proton therapy
- Radiation therapy
- SPECT
- Tomotherapy

== Nuclear weapons ==
Nuclear weapons –

- Nuclear explosion
  - Effects of nuclear explosions
- Types of nuclear weapons
  - Strategic nuclear weapon
    - ICBM
    - SLBM
  - Tactical nuclear weapons
  - List of nuclear weapons
- Nuclear weapons systems
  - Nuclear weapons delivery (missiles, etc.)
  - Nuclear weapon design
  - Nuclear weapons proliferation
  - Nuclear weapons testing
  - List of states with nuclear weapons
  - List of nuclear tests
- Nuclear strategy
  - Assured destruction
  - Counterforce, Countervalue
  - Decapitation strike
  - Deterrence
  - Doctrine for Joint Nuclear Operations
  - Fail-deadly
  - Force de frappe
  - First strike, Second strike
  - Game theory & wargaming
  - Massive retaliation
  - Minimal deterrence
  - Mutual assured destruction (MAD)
  - No first use
  - National Security Strategy of the United States
  - Nuclear attribution
  - Nuclear blackmail
  - Nuclear proliferation
  - Nuclear utilization target selection (NUTS)
  - Single Integrated Operational Plan (SIOP)
  - Strategic bombing
- Nuclear weapons incidents
  - List of sunken nuclear submarines
  - United States military nuclear incident terminology
  - 1950 British Columbia B-36 crash
  - 1950 Rivière-du-Loup B-50 nuclear weapon loss incident
  - 1958 Mars Bluff B-47 nuclear weapon loss incident
  - 1961 Goldsboro B-52 crash
  - 1961 Yuba City B-52 crash
  - 1964 Savage Mountain B-52 crash
  - 1965 Philippine Sea A-4 incident
  - 1966 Palomares B-52 crash
  - 1968 Thule Air Base B-52 crash
  - 2007 United States Air Force nuclear weapons incident

== Nuclear technology scholars ==
- Henri Becquerel
- Niels Bohr
- James Chadwick
- John Cockcroft
- Pierre Curie
- Marie Curie
- Albert Einstein
- Michael Faraday
- Enrico Fermi
- Otto Hahn
- Lise Meitner
- Robert Oppenheimer
- Wolfgang Pauli
- Franco Rasetti
- Ernest Rutherford
- Ernest Walton

== See also ==
- Outline of energy
  - Outline of nuclear power
- List of civilian nuclear ships
- List of military nuclear accidents
- List of nuclear engineers
- List of nuclear medicine radiopharmaceuticals
- List of nuclear waste treatment technologies
- List of particles
- Anti-nuclear movement
