= Impact of the Russo-Ukrainian war on nuclear power plants =

Ukraine is home to four nuclear power plants, as well as the Chernobyl Exclusion Zone, site of the 1986 Chernobyl disaster. As of January 2024, both the Chernobyl and the Zaporizhzhia nuclear power plants saw battles during the war that resulted from the 2022 Russian invasion of Ukraine. The invasion has prompted significant discussion about the status of the power plants, including fears of potential disasters, and has also prompted debates about nuclear energy programmes in other European countries.

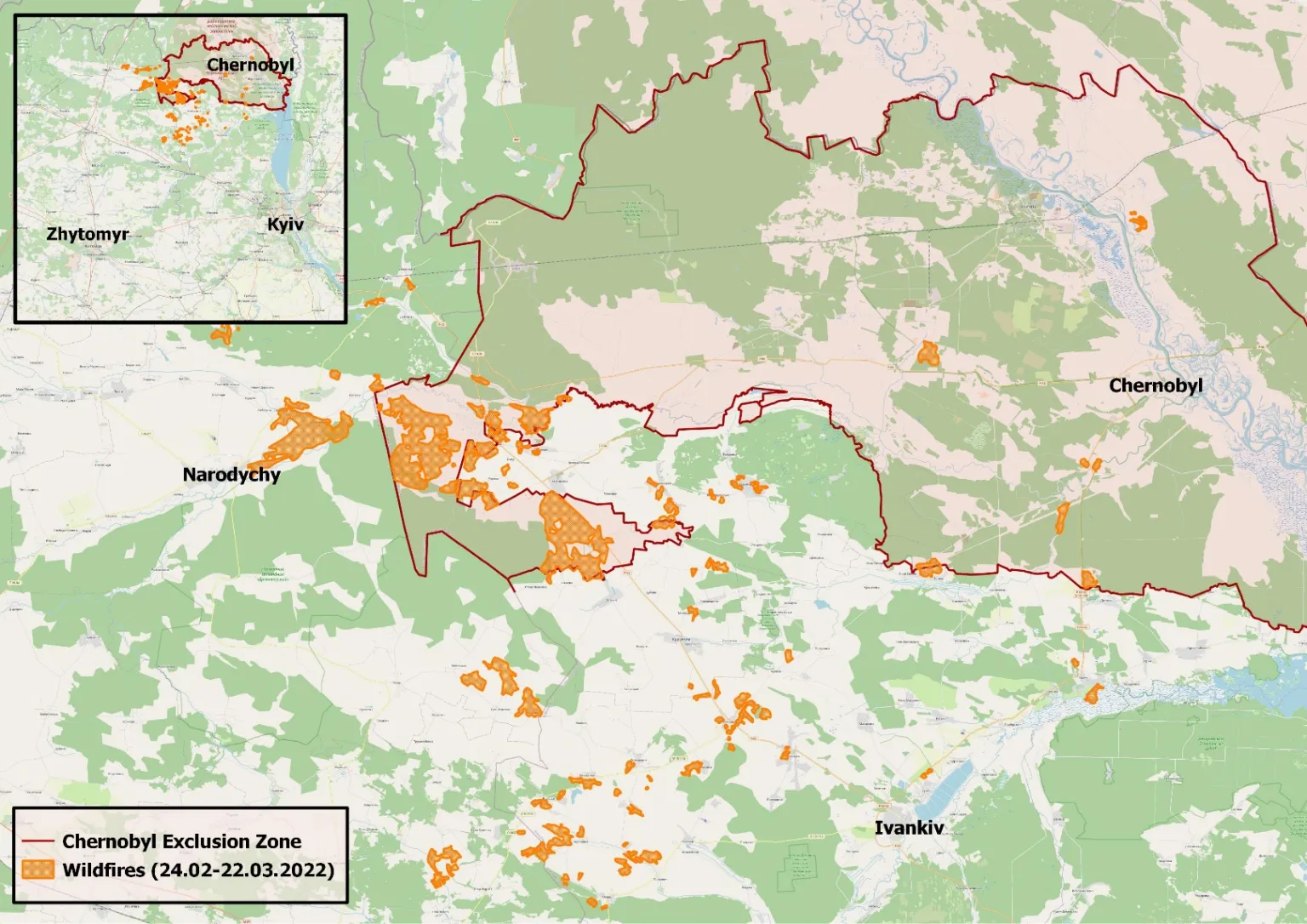
Fires in the forests around Chernobyl between 24 February and 22 March

== Nuclear energy in Ukraine ==
Ukraine is Europe's second-largest producer of nuclear energy; almost half the electricity produced in the country is nuclear energy. Nuclear power plants are vulnerable to direct attack, as are nuclear waste disposal sites. Apart from direct attack, human-made disasters may be caused by operational mistakes, power shortages and connection issues. For instance, without electricity, water cooling of nuclear reactors ceases which may cause a meltdown, as happened in Fukushima. Human operators working under siege or under ongoing stress are more prone to errors.

== Battles ==
As of February 2022, the moving of heavy military vehicles has raised nuclear dust and resulted in a spike of gamma radiation levels in the Chernobyl region 28 times above normal. With local winds mostly tending towards Russia, the impact is spread over two countries currently at war with each other and therefore unlikely to be remediated in a coordinated manner at this time. Ukrainian authorities also claim the Russian army is responsible for arson in the Chernobyl exclusion zone. According to various sources, from 15 to 37 hectares (37 to 91 acres) of forest have been swept by fires.

Chernobyl was captured on 24 February 2022, the first day of the invasion, as part of the Russian offensive on Kyiv. Russian forces captured the exclusion zone the same day.

Enerhodar came under siege on 28 February 2022, as Russian forces advanced on the southern front of the invasion. The Russian assault on the Zaporizhzhia Nuclear Power Plant began on 3 March 2022, capturing the power plant by the next day. On 6 March 2022, the IAEA released a statement expressing concern over potential Russian military interference in the operations of the power plant and over cuts to mobile and internet networks that the plant uses for communications.

In early March, hostilities reached the Zaporizhzhia nuclear power plant, the biggest in Europe and the fifth biggest globally. This nuclear plant houses an amount of nuclear material equivalent to 20 Chernobyls. On 4 March 2022, fighting led to a fire in an auxiliary building. On 30 May 2022, the International Atomic Energy Agency (IAEA) reported loss of connection with servers at the Zaporizhzhia plant, which was not restored until 12 June 2022.

== Possible war crime ==
Ukrainian President Volodymyr Zelenskyy accused Russian President Vladimir Putin of committing "nuclear terror" by ordering the attack on the plant and Ukraine regulatory authorities stated that Russian forces fired artillery shells at the plant, setting fire to the training facility. The Russian Ambassador to the UN responded that Russian forces were fired upon by Ukrainian "saboteurs" from the training facility, which they set fire to when they left. Later on 4 March, the Director General of the International Atomic Energy Agency (IAEA) confirmed that the plant's safety systems had not been affected and there had been no release of radioactive materials, however, he was "... gravely concerned about the situation at Ukraine's largest nuclear power plant. The main priority was to ensure the safety and security of the plant, its power supply and the people who operate it".

Attacks on nuclear power facilities are mainly governed by Article 56 of Additional Protocol I to the Geneva Conventions, which generally prohibits attacks against civilian nuclear power plants. According to international scholars: "if it is established that Russian forces engaged in the shelling of the Zaporizhzhia plant or objectives in its vicinity in a way that risked a radioactive leak, it is almost certain that this operation violated Article 56" but it is "less likely" that Russian forces have committed a war crime in this case.

== Safety concerns ==
Since the occupation of Chernobyl and the Zaporizhzhia power plant, a number of safety concerns have been raised by the IAEA and the Ukrainian government, including over failure to give staff proper rest and lack of regular maintenance work being carried out. Pharmacies in several European countries reported selling out of iodine pills in the first two weeks following the invasion. However, several European nuclear safety authorities have to date concluded that there is no immediate danger of a significant radioactive disaster occurring.

On 6 March 2022, French President Emmanuel Macron held a call with Russian President Vladimir Putin in which he urged Putin to "ensure the safety of these plants and that they are excluded from the conflict." Following the call, the Kremlin released a statement saying that it was willing to engage in negotiations with the IAEA and the Ukrainian government over ensuring that safety.

Rafael Grossi, the Director General of the IAEA, raised concerns about the extremely stressful conditions faced by station personnel. Under constant pressure from the Russian military, personnel were unable to rotate shifts with colleagues outside the facility, and were therefore unable to rest. Food and medicine shortages were also reported. Grossi emphasized that exhausted and stressed personnel are more prone to mistakes. On June 30, the IAEA again lost communications with the plant.

While wide attention has been focused on nuclear power reactors, damage to spent nuclear fuel reservoirs and other forms of storage may be even more devastating. For instance, more than 3000 spent fuel rod containers are stored at the Zaporizhzhia nuclear power plant under the open sky. At other nuclear power plants, spent rods are kept in cooling tanks. Should water in those tanks become warmer or leak, overheated rods may ignite leading to consequences comparable to the Kyshtym disaster. According to the IAEA, two Russian missiles have already hit nuclear waste ponds in Ukraine. Spent nuclear fuel is able to release 20 times the fatal dose of radiation in one hour.

== Debates over nuclear power in Europe ==
The invasion of Ukraine has prompted increased discussion about the future of nuclear power in Europe, with a number of commentators arguing in favour of increasing nuclear power generation in order to decrease dependence on natural gas imported from Russia.

Germany in particular has seen debates over nuclear power phase-out, which has overseen the shutdown of most of the nuclear power plants in the country since 2011, with all remaining plants shut down in April 2023. On 28 February 2022, the German economics minister stated that the German government would consider suspending the phase-out of remaining nuclear power plants in the country. However, on 9 March 2022, Germany released a statement rejecting calls to suspend the phase-out of nuclear power. Belgium has also seen debates about extending the life span of its existing nuclear reactors.

George Monbiot wrote in The Guardian that, Europe

collectively receives 41% of its gas imports and 27% of its oil imports from Russia, [arguing that Europe] reduced ourselves to craven dependency on that despotic government, through a dismal failure to wean ourselves off fossil fuels.

Some commentators have also raised issues of Russian exports of nuclear energy technology. In Finland, the Hanhikivi Nuclear Power Plant project was cancelled due to the invasion. Hartmut Winkler of the University of Johannesburg has stated that Russian state nuclear energy corporation Rosatom faced significant loss of international business due to the invasion, stating that the "era of Russian foreign nuclear builds is therefore soon likely to be over."

== See also ==
- Zaporizhzhia Nuclear Power Plant crisis
- Nuclear power in Ukraine
