= Crimes involving radioactive substances =

Illicit acts involving radioactive material

The radiation warning symbol (trefoil)

This is a list of criminal (or arguably, allegedly, or potentially criminal) acts intentionally involving radioactive substances. Inclusion in this list does not necessarily imply that anyone involved was guilty of a crime.

== Murder and attempted murder ==
=== The Karlsruhe plutonium affair ===
Johannes M. was convicted of attempting to poison his ex-wife in 2001 with plutonium stolen from WAK (Wiederaufbereitungsanlage Karlsruhe), a small scale reprocessing plant where he worked. He did not steal a large amount of plutonium, only rags used for wiping surfaces and a small amount of liquid waste. At least two people (besides the criminal) were contaminated by the plutonium. Two flats in Landau in the Rhineland-Palatinate were contaminated, and had to be cleaned at a cost of two million euro. Photographs of the case and details of other nuclear crimes have been presented by a worker at the Institute for Transuranium Elements.

=== The Litvinenko assassination ===
Alexander Litvinenko died from polonium-210 poisoning in London in 2006. British officials said investigators had concluded the murder of Litvinenko was "a 'state-sponsored' assassination orchestrated by Russian security services." On 20 January 2007 British police announced that they had "identified the man they believe poisoned Alexander Litvinenko," Andrei Lugovoi.

On 21 September 2012, a story was posted in various UK newspapers suggesting the existence of an ongoing cover-up by the British Government over the material facts of the case. The report suggests that many aspects of the case may "never see the light of day" due to the significant risk to UK/Russian relations and the implications of the declaration that an act of nuclear terrorism took place on British soil.

=== Roman Tsepov homicide ===
Roman Tsepov, a politically influential Russian who provided security to Vladimir Putin and others, fell sick on 11 September 2004 after a trip to Moscow, and died on 24 September. A postmortem investigation found a poisoning by an unspecified radioactive material. He had symptoms similar to Aleksandr Litvinenko.

=== Zheleznodorozhny criminal radiological act ===
An unnamed truck driver was killed by five months of radiation exposure to a 1.3 curies (48 GBq) caesium-137 source (about 15 mg) (Note: (1.3 Ci)/(3.215 TBq/g) = 15 mg (where 3.215 TBq/g is the activity of Cs-137)) that had been put into the door of his truck around February 1995. He died of radiation-induced leukemia on 27 April 1997.

=== Vladimir Kaplun radiation homicide ===
In 1993, director of the Kartontara packing company Vladimir Kaplun was killed by radioactive material (cobalt-60 and/or cesium-137) placed in his chair. He died of radiation sickness after a month of hospitalization. The source of the radiation was found after his death.

=== Karen Silkwood poisoning allegations ===
On November 5, 1974, Kerr-McGee worker and labor union activist Karen Silkwood found herself exposed to plutonium-239 after working to grind and polish plutonium pellets by way of a glovebox to be used in nuclear fuel rods at the Cimarron Fuel Fabrication Site in Oklahoma. Inspection of the gloves would yield no evidence of external leakage of radioactive contaminant from the glovebox, despite the fact that plutonium had been found on those surfaces of the gloves that had contact with Silkwood's hands, and no other source for a plutonium leak could be ascertained despite thorough inspections of the air vents and surrounding surfaces. However, on November 6, despite Silkwood's prior decontamination and self-inspection, a detection on her part the next day yielded more signs of alpha activity on her hands, while health physics staff at the plant subsequently detected further alpha activity on her right forearm, neck and face. On November 7, Silkwood tested positive for very significant levels of alpha activity, and an inspection of her apartment showed high levels of radioactive contamination. Thereafter, Silkwood and two other co-workers personally associated with her (roommate Sherri Ellis and boyfriend Drew Stephens) would be tested at Los Alamos National Laboratory; while the latter two only tested positive for insignificant amounts of plutonium exposure, Silkwood was found to have 6–7 nanocuries (220–260 Bq) of plutonium-239 in her lungs, though Los Alamos health physicist Dr. George Voelz determined that this amount was still negligible and non-harmful (and under the permissible standard). Later posthumous measurements taken after Silkwood's death under separate but likewise controversial circumstances were shown to be roughly consistent with the initial findings described by Dr. Voelz, but also indicated that she had somehow ingested plutonium prior to her demise. It would also be found that Karen Silkwood would not have had access to plutonium-239 for months after her transfer from metallography to rod assembly. Moreover, according to the AEC investigation, the bioassay samples she submitted were found to have been tampered with, as they contained plutonium oxide (the chemical form used in the laboratory) versus plutonium nitrate (the form which would be expected in a biological sample).

Allegations that Silkwood's exposure to plutonium-239 was a deliberate act of radiation poisoning are fueled by the fact that she was in possession of potentially compromising evidence that linked Kerr-McGee with egregious safety violations, encompassing unsafe workplace conditions at the plant, faulty manufacture of fuel rod components that posed a potential public safety risk, and even substantial missing plutonium supplies that were unaccounted for; Silkwood also contended that she had evidence that photographs containing evidence of hairline cracks in the fuel rods may have been doctored by company personnel as a cover-up. Multiple of Silkwood's former colleagues opined that Silkwood may have intentionally contaminated herself to support the ongoing union negotiations and draw attention to perceived safety lapses at the facility. Congressional testimony from the AEC later confirmed there was no evidence or basis for allegations of missing plutonium supplies, and a subsequent inventory showed <0.5% deviation between the amount inventoried versus the expected quantity, below NRC control thresholds. As Silkwood was coordinating with fellow union members and had been en route to meet a journalist to present and discuss evidence she had found of Kerr-McGee's actions at the time of her death, unverified assertions that Kerr-McGee or other associated parties may have been involved in her radiation exposure and later fatal car accident have circulated in the following period. The AEC's investigation did not determine the source or method of contamination but did reveal that the urine samples submitted by Silkwood had been tainted with plutonium that was not ingested, based on its chemical form, and numerous other irregularities with regards to Silkwood's behavior and contaminated samples indicated she did not become contaminated via exposure at the plant. For example, urine samples provided by Silkwood at the plant were found to be uncontaminated, while the samples found at her home were highly contaminated at a level inconsistent with "normal" accidental exposure levels (as well as being a chemical form different from that produced by accidental ingestion - see above). Additionally, extensive investigation into the cause and nature of her fatal car accident indicated her potential abuse of Quaaludes (and possibly other drugs), which may have contributed to her fatal crash, especially given testimony by colleagues and friends that she had previously driven while under the influence of sedative drugs. Additionally, Silkwood had previously been suspected of working with hazardous materials while under the influence of Quaaludes.

=== 1972 Texas radiological assault ===
After a 1971 divorce involving limited visitation rights, a Texas man, Kerry Andrus Crocker, deliberately exposed his 11-year-old son to radiological material with the intent to harm. The father, in his role as a petroleum engineer, had access to the cesium-137, as it was used by his company in the oil and gas well industry. On several occasions, the father placed radioactive capsules of cesium-137 on the child's skin while he slept; another time he gave his son headphones to wear that contained the radioactive capsules. The boy developed skin rashes, blisters and lesions from these exposures. The boy also experienced hair loss and radiation-induced castration. This resulted in the child requiring 16 operations, testosterone replacement therapy, and skin grafts. In 1973, the boy was diagnosed with radiation necrosis with "deep indolent ulceration", a dead tendon, and two irreparably damaged testicles caused by the exposures. The father fled after he was convicted in 1975 for the felonies of castration and disfigurement, and in 1981 he was caught after the FBI investigated the case.

== Intentional theft or attempted theft of radioactive material ==
=== Grozny cobalt theft or attempted theft ===
On 13 September 1999, six people attempted to steal radioactive cobalt-60 rods from a chemical plant in the city of Grozny in the Chechen Republic. During the theft, the suspects opened the radioactive material container and handled it, resulting in the deaths of three of the suspects and injury of the remaining three. The suspect who held the material directly in his hands died of radiation exposure 30 minutes later. This incident is described as an attempted theft, but some of the rods are reportedly still missing.

== Clandestine use of X-ray equipment ==
Some former East German dissidents claim that the Stasi used X-ray equipment to induce cancer in political prisoners. After the fall of the Socialist Republic of Romania, files released indicated that the secret police, Securitate, had intentionally induced cancer in striking miners.

Similarly, some anti-Castro activists claim that the Cuban secret police sometimes used radioactive isotopes to induce cancer in "adversaries they wished to destroy with as little notice as possible". In 1997, the Cuban expatriate columnist Carlos Alberto Montaner called this method "the Bulgarian Treatment", after its alleged use by the Bulgarian secret police.

In 1989, following a workplace conflict, a worker activated an industrial radiography generator exposing a colleague who was preparing for the inspection of a section of a ship hull. In consequence, this worker was exposed to an effective dose estimated at 438 mSv. While the victim did not suffer any obvious short or long term negative physical health effect, he was psychologically affected by the experience.

== Illicit, fraudulent, and patent medicine ==
In the early 20th century a series of products claiming medicinal properties, which contained radioactive elements were marketed to the general public. This does not include certain medications that contain radioactive isotopes (e.g. iodine-131 for its oncological uses) but pertains to elixirs and other medications that made preposterous claims (see below) that were neither scientific nor verifiable.

Radithor, a well known patent medicine or snake oil, is possibly the best known example of radioactive quackery. It consisted of triple distilled water containing at a minimum 1 microcurie (37 kBq) each of the radium-226 and radium-228 isotopes.

Radithor was manufactured from 1918 to 1928 by the Bailey Radium Laboratories, Inc., of East Orange, New Jersey. The head of the laboratories was listed as Dr. William J. A. Bailey, not a medical doctor. It was advertised as "A Cure for the Living Dead" as well as "Perpetual Sunshine".

These radium elixirs were marketed similarly to the way opioids were peddled to the masses with laudanum an age earlier, and electrical cure-alls during the same time period such as the Prostate Warmer.

The eventual death of the socialite Eben Byers from Radithor consumption and the associated radiation poisoning led to the strengthening of the Food and Drug Administration's powers and the demise of most radiation based patent medication.

== See also ==
- Nuclear espionage
- Nuclear terrorism
- Vulnerability of nuclear facilities to attack
