= Real Time Digital Simulator =

Simulator for power systems

Real Time Digital Simulator or RTS (https://standards.ieee.org/ieee/2004/11300/) as the abbreviation recommended by IEEE committee on real-time simulator applied for power systems provides power systems simulation technology for fast, reliable, accurate, and cost-effective study of power systems with complex High Voltage Alternating Current (HVAC) and High Voltage Direct Current (HVDC) networks. The RTS is a fully digital electromagnetic transient power system simulator that operates in real time.

== About ==
The system's graphical user interface, proprietary software and mathematical algorithms can simulate any modern electric power grid configuration. As new equipment or components are added or subtracted from the simulator's configuration, the model instantly updates. For example, researchers can run simulated system-failure scenarios such as a control system cyberintrusion or a physical damage event such as a terrorist attack or natural disaster and instantly detect the order and reasoning for why dedicated relays, breakers or substations failed.

== Advantages ==
Because the simulator functions in real time, the power system algorithms are calculated quickly enough to continuously produce output conditions that realistically represent conditions in a real network. Real-time simulation is significant for two reasons—the user can test physical devices and the user is more productive by completing many studies quickly with real-time simulation.
