= Baltic nuclear power plant =

Baltic nuclear power plant may refer to:

- Ignalina Nuclear Power Plant, a shuttered power plant in Lithuania
- Visaginas Nuclear Power Plant, a planned power plant in Lithuania
- Kaliningrad Nuclear Power Plant, under construction in Russia
