= Nuclear Emergency Support Team =

United States nuclear emergency response unit

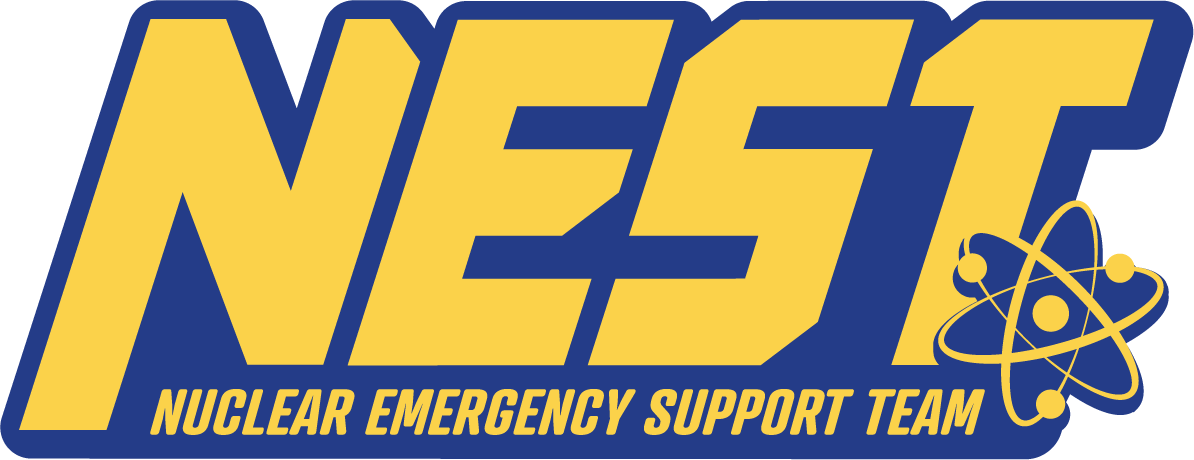
- Logo of the Nuclear Emergency Support Team

Unit overview
- Formed: November 18, 1974; 51 years ago
- Jurisdiction: United States
- Motto: "Scientifically Informed, Operationally Focused"
- Parent department: U.S. Department of Energy
- Parent agency: National Nuclear Security Administration
- Website: https://www.energy.gov/nnsa/nuclear-emergency-support-team-nest

The Nuclear Emergency Support Team (NEST) is the United States government's primary interagency emergency response unit for assessing and triaging contingencies involving nuclear material. The team is part of the Department of Energy's National Nuclear Security Administration (DOE/NNSA) and can quickly deploy anywhere in the world. It is staffed by scientists, technicians, engineers, analysts, military, law enforcement, and public safety personnel who volunteer to serve with the unit on a part-time on-call basis.

NEST is the umbrella designation that encompasses all DOE/NNSA radiological and nuclear emergency response functions; some of which date back more than 60 years. NEST's responsibilities include both national security missions, particularly; countering weapons of mass destruction (WMD) and public health and safety, including responses to nuclear reactor accidents. NEST's task is to be "prepared to respond immediately to any type of radiological accident or incident anywhere in the world."

Originally known as the Nuclear Emergency Search Team, NEST encompasses more than 20 of DOE’s and NNSA’s individual response assets and programs, each with their own mission – and acronym. They range from keeping track of wind patterns around the world (the National Atmospheric Release Advisory Center or NARAC) to supporting medical personnel who encounter radiation injuries (the Radiation Emergency Assistance Center/Training Site or REAC/TS).

NEST was established November 1, 1974, by Ernest Graves Jr., then-head of military applications for the Atomic Energy Commission, who sent a memo that established NEST and highlighted the importance of readiness, collaboration, specialized equipment, coordination among the National Laboratories.

== History ==
Concerns over scenarios involving nuclear accidents or incidents on American soil reach back decades. As early as the 1960s, officials were concerned that a nuclear weapon might be smuggled into the country or that an airplane carrying a nuclear weapon might crash and contaminate surrounding areas.

In late 1974, the FBI received a communication from an extortionist who wanted $200,000 (equivalent to $1,306,000 in 2025) and claimed that a nuclear weapon had been placed somewhere in Boston. President Gerald Ford was warned, and a team of experts from the United States Atomic Energy Commission rushed in, but their radiation detection gear arrived at a different airport. Federal officials then resorted to renting a fleet of vans to carry concealed radiation detectors around the city, but the officials forgot to bring the tools they needed to install the equipment. The incident was later found to be a hoax.

However, the government's response highlighted the need for an agency capable of effectively responding to such threats in the future. Later that year, President Ford created the Nuclear Emergency Support Team (NEST), which under the Atomic Energy Act is tasked with investigating the 'illegal use of nuclear materials within the United States, including terrorist threats involving the use of special nuclear materials'.

One of NEST's first responses was in Spokane, Washington, on November 23, 1976. An unknown group called Omega mailed an extortion threat claiming they would explode containers of radioactive water all over the city unless they were paid $500,000 (equivalent to $2,829,000 in 2025). Presumably, the containers had been stolen from the Hanford Site, less than 150 miles (240 km) to the southwest. NEST immediately flew in a support aircraft from Las Vegas and began searching for non-natural radiation but found nothing. Despite the elaborate instructions initially given by Omega, no further contact was received, and no one made any attempt to claim the (fake) money, which was kept under surveillance. Within days, the incident was deemed a hoax, though the case was never solved. To avoid panic, the public was not notified until a few years later.

One of the more high-profile responses in NEST’s early history took place in August 1980 when several men planted a sophisticated bomb containing 1,000 pounds of dynamite at Harvey's Resort Hotel in Stateline, Nevada. In addition to explosive ordnance disposal (EOD) personnel from the FBI, NEST experts were brought in to assist in diagnosing and defeating the device. However, attempts to disarm the bomb were unsuccessful, the bomb exploded and caused extensive damage to the hotel and nearby buildings. The limitations of the tactics, tools, and procedures used in the response to the casino bomb—coupled with the fear that a similarly complex device might contain nuclear or radiological material—led to sweeping improvements in NEST’s device defeat capabilities.

A more recent example of a NEST deployment was its response to the 2011 nuclear disaster at the Fukushima Daiichi Nuclear Power Plant in Okuma, Fukushima Prefecture, Japan. The event, primarily caused by the 2011 Tohoku earthquake and tsunami, resulted in the most severe nuclear accident since the Chernobyl disaster in 1986. NEST personnel with expertise in atmospheric modeling, aerial measuring, and health physics were deployed to Japan shortly after the disaster occurred. The scientific advice that NEST provided during this emergency was crucial to informing the responses of both the U.S. and Japanese governments to protect public health.

== Today ==
According to the Bulletin of the Atomic Scientists, NEST has the ability to deploy as many as 600 people to the scene of a radiological incident, though deployments do not usually exceed 45 people. NEST has a variety of equipment (weighing up to 150 tons) and has the support of a small fleet of aircraft which includes four helicopters and three airplanes, all outfitted with detection equipment.

When an airborne response to an incident is underway, the Federal Aviation Administration grants NEST flights a higher control priority within the United States National Airspace System, designated with the callsign "FLYNET".

== Capabilities ==
The Nuclear Emergency Support Team (NEST) is NNSA’s multi-mission nuclear emergency response capability that functions as a first-response unit for incidents involving nuclear material from both nuclear reactors and nuclear weapons.

These include all field-deployed and remote technical support to the Nation’s countering weapons of mass destruction (WMD) operations, including Preventive Nuclear and Radiological Detection (PNRD) and threat-based nuclear search; public health and safety missions, including radiological consequence management; and responses to U.S. nuclear weapon accidents and incidents. Additionally, NEST maintains operational capabilities that enable nuclear forensic analysis of nuclear material used in an improvised nuclear device or interdicted outside of regulatory control. NEST’s motto – “Scientifically Informed, Operationally Focused” – reflects the technical underpinning of its diverse operational missions.

NEST is composed of numerous response assets designed to counter WMD threats, respond to accidents involving U.S. nuclear stockpile weapons, and threats to public health and safety. The assets include:

- Accident Response Group (ARG)
- Aerial Measuring System (AMS)
- Detonation Assessment Program (DAP)
- Disposition and Forensic Evidence Analysis Team (DFEAT)
- DOE Forensics Operations (DFO)
- Federal Radiation Monitoring and Assessment Center (FRMAC)
- Joint Technical Operations Team (JTOT)
- National Atmospheric Release Advisory Center (NARAC)
- National Search Team (NST)
- Nuclear Forensics-Material Analysis Program
- Radiation Emergency Assistance Center / Training Site (REAC/TS)
- Radiological Assistance Program (RAP)

Since 1975, NEST has been warned of 125 nuclear terror threats and has responded to 30. NEST has numerous ways to detect radiation. At first, there were still some problems with this simple distinction, as man-made radiation also includes such things as medical radiation. In 2004, a man under treatment for Graves' disease with radioactive iodine set off alarms in the New York City subway. After being strip-searched and interrogated he was sent on his way.

Since its initial creation, the detection equipment has been improved and now data can be processed accurately enough to aim in on the activity of any single nuclear element desired.

== See also ==
- Broken Arrow
- Department of Homeland Security
- Federal Emergency Management Agency
- Nuclear power plant emergency response team
