= Nuclear attribution =

Act of tracking down the source of nuclear material used in a nuclear explosion

Nuclear attribution is the process of tracing the origin of nuclear material that has been used in a nuclear explosion. The problem is not necessarily a straightforward one, for it may be possible to obtain nuclear precursors through the black market, and therefore relatively anonymously. Attribution to the source is desirable due to the trend of nuclear proliferation. Nuclear capability has expanded from only a couple of states, to where a terrorist group could make a bomb with only partial state backing. The United States has demonstrated its interest in nuclear attribution by passing the Nuclear Forensics and Attribution Act, which calls for the development of attribution capabilities.

== Nuclear Forensics ==
A primary method used in nuclear attribution is nuclear forensics. The first step in this process is field work. Radiation levels can be quickly determined in the field using dosimetry. Reports from local survivors help provide visual evidence. The early data from the field, in addition to seismic data, can be used to establish that the bomb was actually nuclear and estimate its yield. The gathered samples will be shipped to laboratories and analyzed using isotope analysis and other methods. The isotopic signature can then be compared with known isotopic data and the likely history of the nuclear material can be pieced together.

== Intelligence ==
Another aspect of nuclear attribution is the use of law enforcement and intelligence. This involves the monitoring of lost nuclear material, as well as known or suspected enrichment facilities. The latter is often done with satellite imagery. This data can be compared with the forensic evidence to increase the probability of accuracy.

== Problems ==
The goal of nuclear attribution is to pinpoint the source of nuclear material with a credible level of accuracy. This faces a number of practical difficulties. First is that the lab work relies on comparing gathered samples to samples that have already been analyzed. Until there is significant international cooperation to develop a database, it will be difficult to specifically determine the source of the nuclear material. Analysis may consist more of places that are likely not to be the source, than specifically where it is from. This will reduce its usefulness to political leaders who have to make quick decisions. Collecting the samples themselves will be difficult in the event of a nuclear explosion. The local infrastructure will likely be overwhelmed and may not be able to respondly quickly enough to gather fresh data. The environment will likely also be highly radioactive, especially if a dirty bomb is used. Getting trained humans on site could be prohibitively difficult. Another problem is that the process of nuclear attribution takes time. Political pressure could dictate a response from leaders far before the months it may take to conduct a full analysis of the source material.

== See also ==
- Nuclear terrorism
- Counter-terrorism
