= Oleg Khinsagov =

Oleg Khinsagov (Russian: Олег Хинсагов) is a Russian citizen from Vladikavkaz, North Ossetia–Alania. On January 25, 2007, he was sentenced by a Georgian court for 8.5 years for smuggling 100 grams of highly enriched uranium.

According to the Georgian authorities, in January 2006, Khinsagov together with a few Georgian citizens from the separatist region of South Ossetia was trying to sell 100 grams of highly enriched uranium. He claimed that the material is only a sample and he has more than 3 kilograms of the substance in his Vladikavkaz garage. Georgian police arranged meeting of Khinsagov with their Turkish-speaking agent introduced as a representative of a rich Muslim organization willing to buy the sample for $1 million US. At the meeting held on February 1, 2006, Khinsagov was arrested with 100 grams of a substance in two plastic pouches. The chemical analysis performed by an American Department of Energy Lab confirmed the substance as being a U-235 purity of 89.451 percent enriched Uranium that makes it a weapons-grade material.

The Georgian side accused Russian investigators in the lack of cooperation with the investigation. According to Rosatom the Georgian side did not provide enough material to pinpoint its origin, still the FSB report provided for the Georgian investigators confirmed the substance as being the highly enriched uranium and indicated it was processed more than ten years ago.

== Sources ==
- A Smuggler’s Story by Lawrence Scott Sheets: Atlantic Monthly, April 2008.
