= Talat Masood =

Pakistan army general

Lieutenant General Talat Masood HI(M) SBt
- Born: Talat Masood; 1928 (age 97–98); Hyderabad Deccan, British India (present-day India)
- Military career
- Allegiance: Pakistan
- Branch: Pakistan Army
- Service years: 1950 - 1990
- Rank: Lt. Gen.
- Nickname: Gen. Masood
- Service number: PA No.–3894
- Unit: Pakistan Army Corps of EME
- Commands: Federal Secretary to MoDP; Chairman POF; Heavy Industries Taxila
- Conflicts: Indo-Pakistani War of 1965; Indo-Pakistani War of 1971
- Awards: Hilal-e-Imtiaz (Military) (Crescent of Excellence) Award by the President of Pakistan; Sitara-e-Basalat
- Other work: Columnist; Political Commentator

Talat Masood HI(M) SBt (Urdu: طلعت مسعُود) is a retired three-star rank army general, a political commentator, and a mechanical engineer.

His career in the military spent in the Pakistan Army Corps of EME as an engineering officer and also served as the Federal Secretary at the Ministry of Defence Production of Government of Pakistan. He is noted for his analysis on the global national security, economic stability, and often consults on politics on the national and international media networks.

== Biography ==
Talat Masood was born to a noble and highly educated Urdu speaking family of Hyderabad Deccan. He joined the Pakistan Military Academy, and was educated at the Military College of Engineering where he graduated with a B.S. in mechanical engineering.

In 1951, he gained commission in the Corps of EME, where his career in the army is mostly spent. In 1951–54, 2nd-Lt. Masood was one of the few army officers who were sent to the United Kingdom to attend the Loughborough University where he did the post-graduate studies. He gained M.S. in mechanical engineering from the Loughborough University and joined the Pakistan Ordnance Factories for evaluation of fire arms and weapons accuracy.

He attended the Command and Staff College in Quetta where he qualified as a psc, and later went attended the National Defence University (NDU) where he gained MSc in defence studies.

He participated in the conflicts and wars with India in 1965 and in 1971, but his career mostly spent in the local defense production. About the aerial operations by PAF, Masood is of the view that: "The mobility, even the survivability of land forces depended to a large extent on air cover, so does the naval security. Superior air power is thus vital for any military engagement."

In the 1970s, he served as the chairman of the Heavy Industries Taxila (HIT), where he was involved in the design and development of the various military vehicles and the technology evaluation of the main battle tanks.

In the 1980s, he was appointed as chairman of the Pakistan Ordnance Factories (POF), where he is credited of bringing the fire-arm manufacturing organization to its peak of efficiency especially in the manufacturing of the chemical explosives. In 1988–89, he was involved in the technology transfer of the Mirage III at the Pakistan Aeronautical Complex, and witnessed the induction of the aircraft to the UAE Air Force.

In 1988, Lt-Gen. Masood joined the Benazir administration when he appointed as the secretary of defense production, which he served until he retired from his military service with the army in 1990 after serving for 39 years.

== Post-retirement activities ==
After his retirement in 1990, Masood became a political consultant to several important U.S. think tanks and technology firms.

He writes newspaper columns regularly on political and security issues in English-language newspapers in Pakistan and as a foreign political correspondent in international magazines. In November–December 1997, he was appointed as visiting fellow at the Stimson Center in Washington DC in the United States where his research topic included the discussion and rational on "nuclear weapons issues in the subcontinent."

Since 2013, Masood is on Council of Pugwash Conferences on World Affairs.

== Awards and decorations ==

	Hilal-e-Imtiaz (Military) (Crescent of Excellence)		
Sitara-e-Basalat (Star of Good Conduct)	Sitara-e-Harb 1971 War (War Star 1971)	Tamgha-e-Jang 1965 War (War Medal 1965)	Tamgha-e-Jang 1971 War (War Medal 1971)
Tamgha-e-Sad Saala Jashan-e- Wiladat-e-Quaid-e-Azam (100th Birth Anniversary of Muhammad Ali Jinnah) 1976	Tamgha-e-Jamhuria (Republic Commemoration Medal) 1956	Hijri Tamgha (Hijri Medal) 1979	Jamhuriat Tamgha (Democracy Medal) 1988
