= Nuclear power plant emergency response team =

A nuclear power plant emergency response team (ERT) is an incident response team composed of plant personnel and civil authority personnel specifically trained to respond to the occurrence of an accident at a nuclear power plant.

Each nuclear power plant is required to have a detailed emergency plan. In the event of a potential accident (as defined by the International Nuclear Event Scale), the ERT personnel are notified by beeper and have a set time limit for reporting to their duty station.

Potential duty stations include:

- The nuclear power plant's control room
- The nuclear power plant's Emergency Operations Facility
- An offsite (i.e., not near the nuclear plant) operations facility
- A news center
- Roving teams of health physicists who scan for possible radiation
- Police traffic direction

In the United States, ERT personnel are required to train twice a year and typically train four times. The Federal Emergency Management Agency (FEMA) (with support from the Nuclear Regulatory Commission (NRC) and other agencies) grades some of the drills. The drills normally are not announced in advance so as to simulate "surprise" conditions.

== See also ==
- List of nuclear power stations
- List of nuclear reactors
- Nuclear Emergency Support Team (NEST) - different from ERTs here
- Nuclear reactor technology
