= Pulse-height analyzer =

A pulse-height analyzer (PHA) is an instrument that accepts electronic pulses of varying heights from particle and event detectors, digitizes the pulse heights, and saves the number of pulses of each height in registers or channels, thus recording a pulse-height spectrum or pulse-height distribution used for later pulse-height analysis. PHAs are used in nuclear- and elementary-particle physics research. A PHA is a specific modification to multichannel analyzers.

A pulse-height analyzer is also integrated into particle counters or used as a discrete module to calibrate particle counters.

== See also ==
- Nuclear electronics
