= Quadrupole splitting =

Mössbauer spectrum of sodium nitroprusside, exhibiting quadruple splitting

Quadrupole splitting is an example of a hyperfine interaction found in gamma-ray spectroscopy, in the circumstance where nuclei with a non-radially-symmetric shape (that is, with a spin quantum number greater than 1/2) are found immersed in an external electric field gradient. It splits a state into two, producing a doublet in the Mössbauer spectrum, and the separation between the states can be used to measure the sign and strength of this electric field gradient, which is affected by the chemical environment of the nuclei.
