= Mössbauer spectroscopy =

Spectroscopic technique

A Mössbauer absorption spectrum of ^{57}Fe

Mössbauer spectroscopy is a spectroscopic technique based on the Mössbauer effect. This effect, discovered by Rudolf Mössbauer (sometimes written "Moessbauer", German: "Mößbauer") in 1958, consists of the nearly recoil-free emission and absorption of nuclear gamma rays in solids. The consequent nuclear spectroscopy method is exquisitely sensitive to small changes in the chemical environment of certain nuclei.

Typically, three types of nuclear interactions may be observed: the isomer shift due to differences in nearby electron densities (also called the chemical shift in older literature), quadrupole splitting due to atomic-scale electric field gradients; and magnetic splitting due to non-nuclear magnetic fields. Due to the high energy and extremely narrow line widths of nuclear gamma rays, Mössbauer spectroscopy is a highly sensitive technique in terms of energy (and hence frequency) resolution, capable of detecting changes of just a few parts in 10^{11}.

== Basic principle ==
Just as a gun recoils when a bullet is fired, conservation of momentum requires a nucleus (such as in a gas) to recoil during the emission or absorption of a gamma ray. If a nucleus at rest emits a gamma ray, the energy of the gamma ray is slightly less than the natural energy of the transition, but in order for a nucleus at rest to absorb a gamma ray, the gamma ray's energy must be slightly greater than the natural energy because in both cases energy is lost to recoil. This means that nuclear resonance (emission and absorption of the same gamma ray by identical nuclei) is unobservable with free nuclei because the shift in energy is too great, and the emission and absorption spectra have no significant overlap.

Nuclei in a solid crystal, however, are not free to recoil because they are bound in place in the crystal lattice. When a nucleus in a solid emits or absorbs a gamma ray, some energy can still be lost as recoil energy, but in this case, it always occurs in discrete packets called phonons (quantized vibrations of the crystal lattice). Any whole number of phonons can be emitted, including zero, which is known as a "recoil-free" event. In this case, the conservation of momentum is satisfied by the momentum of the crystal as a whole, so practically no energy is lost.

Mössbauer found that a significant fraction of emission and absorption events will be recoil-free, which is quantified using the Lamb–Mössbauer factor. This fact is what makes Mössbauer spectroscopy possible, because it means that gamma rays emitted by one nucleus can be resonantly absorbed by a sample containing nuclei of the same isotope, and this absorption can be measured.

The recoil fraction of the Mössbauer absorption is analyzed by nuclear resonance vibrational spectroscopy.

== Typical method ==
In its most common form, Mössbauer absorption spectroscopy, a solid sample is exposed to a beam of gamma radiation, and a detector measures the intensity of the beam transmitted through the sample. The atoms in the source emitting the gamma rays must be of the same isotope as the atoms in the sample absorbing them.

If the emitting and absorbing nuclei were in identical chemical environments, the nuclear transition energies would be exactly equal and resonant absorption would be observed with both materials at rest. The difference in chemical environments, however, causes the nuclear energy levels to shift in a few different ways, as described below. Although these energy shifts are tiny (often less than a micro-electronvolt), the extremely narrow spectral linewidths of gamma rays for some radionuclides make the small energy shifts correspond to large changes in absorbance. To bring the two nuclei back into resonance, it is necessary to change the energy of the gamma ray slightly, and in practice, this is always done using the Doppler shift.

During Mössbauer absorption spectroscopy, the source is accelerated through a range of velocities using a linear motor to produce a Doppler effect and scan the gamma-ray energy through a given range. A typical range of velocities for ^{57}Fe, for example, can be ±11 mm/s (1 mm/s = 48.075 neV).

In the resulting spectra, gamma ray intensity is plotted as a function of the source velocity. At velocities corresponding to the resonant energy levels of the sample, a fraction of the gamma rays are absorbed, resulting in a drop in the measured intensity and a corresponding dip in the spectrum. The number, positions, and intensities of the dips (also called peaks; dips in transmittance are peaks in absorbance) provide information about the chemical environment of the absorbing nuclei and can be used to characterize the sample.

== Selecting a suitable source ==
Suitable gamma-ray sources consist of a radioactive parent that decays to the desired isotope. For example, the source for ^{57}Fe consists of ^{57}Co, which decays by electron capture to an excited state of ^{57}Fe, which in turn decays to a ground state via a series of gamma-ray emissions that include the one exhibiting the Mössbauer effect. The radioactive cobalt is prepared on a foil, often of rhodium. Ideally the parent isotope will have a convenient half-life. Also, the gamma-ray energy should be relatively low, otherwise the system will have a low recoil-free fraction resulting in a poor signal-to-noise ratio and requiring long collection times. The periodic table below indicates those elements having an isotope suitable for Mössbauer spectroscopy. Of these, ^{57}Fe is by far the most common element studied using the technique, although ^{129}I, ^{119}Sn, and ^{121}Sb are also frequently studied.

Periodic table of Mössbauer-active elements
H																	He
Li	Be											B	C	N	O	F	Ne
Na	Mg											Al	Si	P	S	Cl	Ar
K	Ca	Sc	Ti	V	Cr	Mn	Fe	Co	Ni	Cu	Zn	Ga	Ge	As	Se	Br	Kr
Rb	Sr	Y	Zr	Nb	Mo	Tc	Ru	Rh	Pd	Ag	Cd	In	Sn	Sb	Te	I	Xe
Cs	Ba	La	Hf	Ta	W	Re	Os	Ir	Pt	Au	Hg	Tl	Pb	Bi	Po	At	Rn
Fr	Ra	Ac	Rf	Db	Sg	Bh	Hs	Mt	Ds	Rg	Cn	Nh	Fl	Mc	Lv	Ts	Og
			Ce	Pr	Nd	Pm	Sm	Eu	Gd	Tb	Dy	Ho	Er	Tm	Yb	Lu
			Th	Pa	U	Np	Pu	Am	Cm	Bk	Cf	Es	Fm	Md	No	Lr
Mössbauer-active elements / Gamma-ray sources / Unsuitable for Mössbauer

== Analysis of Mössbauer spectra ==
As described above, Mössbauer spectroscopy has an extremely fine energy resolution and can detect even subtle changes in the nuclear environment of the relevant atoms. Typically, there are three types of nuclear interactions that are observed: isomeric shift, quadrupole splitting, and hyperfine magnetic splitting.

=== Isomer shift ===
Fig. 2: Chemical shift and quadrupole splitting of the nuclear energy levels and corresponding Mössbauer spectra

Isomer shift (δ) (also sometimes called chemical shift, especially in the older literature) is a relative measure describing a shift in the resonance energy of a nucleus (see Fig. 2) due to the transition of electrons within its s orbitals. The whole spectrum is shifted in either a positive or negative direction depending upon the s electron charge density in the nucleus. This change arises due to alterations in the electrostatic response between the non-zero probability s orbital electrons and the non-zero volume nucleus they orbit.

Only electrons in s orbitals have a non-zero probability of being found in the nucleus (see atomic orbitals). However, p, d, and f electrons may influence the s electron density through a screening effect.

Isomer shift can be expressed using the formula below, where K is a nuclear constant, the difference between R_{e}^{2} and R_{g}^{2} is the effective nuclear charge radius difference between excited state and the ground state, and the difference between [Ψ_{s}^{2}(0)]_{a} and [Ψ_{s}^{2}(0)]_{b} is the electron density difference in the nucleus (a = source, b = sample). The Chemical Isomer shift as described here does not change with temperature, however, Mössbauer spectra do have a temperature sensitivity due to a relativistic effect known as the second-order Doppler effect. Generally, the impact of this effect is small, and the IUPAC standard allows the Isomer Shift to be reported without correcting for it.

$$\text{CS} = K\left(\langle R_e^2\rangle - \langle R_g^2\rangle\right)\left([\Psi_s^2(0)]_b - [\Psi_s^2(0)]_a\right).$$

The physical meaning of this equation can be clarified using examples:

1. While an increase in s-electron density in ^{57}Fe spectrum gives a negative shift because the change in the effective nuclear charge is negative (owing to R_{e} < R_{g}), an increase in s-electron density in ^{119}Sn gives a positive shift due to a positive change in overall nuclear charge (owing to R_{e} > R_{g}).
2. Oxidised ferric ions (Fe^{3+}) have lower isomer shifts than ferrous ions (Fe^{2+}) because s-electron density at the nucleus of ferric ions is greater due to a weaker screening effect by d electrons.

The isomer shift is useful for determining oxidation state, valency states, electron shielding and the electron-drawing power of electronegative groups.

=== Quadrupole splitting ===
Fig. 3: Sodium nitroprusside is a common reference material exhibiting quadrupole splitting.

Quadrupole splitting reflects the interaction between the nuclear energy levels and the surrounding electric field gradient (EFG). Nuclei in states with non-spherical charge distributions, i.e. all those with a spin quantum number (I) greater than 1/2, may have a nuclear quadrupole moment. In this case, an asymmetrical electric field (produced by an asymmetric electronic charge distribution or ligand arrangement) splits the nuclear energy levels.

In the case of an isotope with a I = 3/2 excited state, such as ^{57}Fe or ^{119}Sn, the excited state is split into two substates m_{I} = ±1/2 and m_{I} = ±3/2. The ground-to-excited state transitions appear as two specific peaks in a spectrum, sometimes referred to as a "doublet". Quadrupole splitting is measured as the separation between these two peaks and reflects the character of the electric field at the nucleus.

The quadrupole splitting can be used for determining the oxidation state, spin state, site symmetry, and the arrangement of ligands.

Fig. 4: Mössbauer spectrum and diagram illustrating magnetic splitting in ^{57}Fe.

=== Magnetic hyperfine splitting ===
Magnetic hyperfine splitting is a result of the interaction between the nucleus and a surrounding magnetic field (similar to the Zeeman effect in atomic spectra). A nucleus with spin I splits into 2I + 1 sub-energy levels in the presence of a magnetic field. For example, the first excited state of the ^{57}Fe nucleus with spin state I = 3/2 will split into 4 non-degenerate sub-states with m_{I} values of +3/2, +1/2, −1/2 and −3/2. The equally-spaced splits are said to be hyperfine, being on the order of 10^{−7} eV. The selection rule for magnetic dipole transitions means that transitions between the excited state and ground state can only occur where m_{I} changes by 0 or 1 or −1. This gives 6 possible for a 3/2 to 1/2 transition.

The extent of splitting is proportional to the magnetic field strength at the nucleus, which in turn depends on the electron distribution ("chemical environment") of the nucleus. The splitting can be measured, for instance, with a sample foil placed between an oscillating source and a photon detector (see Fig. 5), resulting in an absorption spectrum, as illustrated in Fig. 4. The magnetic field can be determined from the spacing between the peaks if the quantum "g-factors" of the nuclear states are known. In ferromagnetic materials, including many iron compounds, the natural internal magnetic fields are quite strong and their effects dominate the spectra.

=== Combination of all ===
The three Mössbauer parameters, isomer shift, quadrupole splitting, and hyperfine splitting, can often be used to identify a particular compound by comparison to spectra for standards. In some cases, a compound may have more than one possible position for the Mössbauer active atom. For example, the crystal structure of magnetite (Fe_{3}O_{4}) supports two different sites for the iron atoms. Its spectrum has 12 peaks, a sextet for each potential atomic site, corresponding to two sets of Mössbauer parameters.

Many times all effects are observed: isomer shift, quadrupole splitting, and magnetic splitting. In such cases the isomer shift is given by the average of all lines. The quadrupole splitting when all the four excited sub-states are equally shifted (two sub-states are lifted and the other two are lowered) is given by the shift of the outer two lines relative to the inner four lines (all inner four lines shift in opposition to the outermost two lines). Usually fitting software is used for accurate values.

In addition, the relative intensities of the various peaks reflect the relative concentrations of compounds in a sample and can be used for semi-quantitative analysis. Also, since ferromagnetic phenomena are size-dependent, in some cases, spectra can provide insight into the crystallite size and grain structure of a material.

== Mössbauer emission spectroscopy ==
Mössbauer emission spectroscopy is a specialized variant of Mössbauer spectroscopy where the emitting element is in the probed sample, and the absorbing element is in the reference. Most commonly, the technique is applied to the ^{57}Co/^{57}Fe pair. A typical application is the characterization of the cobalt sites in amorphous Co-Mo catalysts used in hydrodesulfurization. In such a case, the sample is doped with ^{57}Co.

== Applications ==
Among the technique's drawbacks are the limited number of gamma-ray sources and the requirement that samples be solid to eliminate the nucleus's recoil. Mössbauer spectroscopy is unique in its sensitivity to subtle changes in the nucleus's chemical environment, including changes in oxidation state, the effect of different ligands on a particular atom, and the magnetic environment of the sample.

As an analytical tool, Mössbauer spectroscopy has been especially useful in the field of geology for identifying the composition of iron-containing specimens, including meteorites and Moon rocks. In situ data collection of Mössbauer spectra has also been carried out on iron-rich rocks on Mars.

In another application, Mössbauer spectroscopy is used to characterize phase transformations in iron catalysts, e.g., those used for Fischer–Tropsch synthesis. While initially consisting of hematite (Fe_{2}O_{3}), these catalysts transform into a mixture of magnetite (Fe_{3}O_{4}) and several iron carbides. The formation of carbides appears to improve catalytic activity, but it can also lead to the mechanical break-up and attrition of the catalyst particles, which can cause difficulties in the final separation of the catalyst from reaction products.

Mössbauer spectroscopy has also been used to determine the relative concentration change in the oxidation state of antimony (Sb) during the selective oxidation of olefins. During calcination, all the Sb ions in an antimony-containing tin dioxide catalyst transform into the +5 oxidation state. Following the catalytic reaction, almost all Sb ions revert from the +5 to the +3 oxidation state. A significant change in the chemical environment surrounding the antimony nucleus occurs during the oxidation state change which can easily be monitored as an isomer shift in the Mössbauer spectrum.

This technique has also been used to observe the second-order transverse Doppler effect predicted by the theory of relativity, because of very high energy resolution.

=== Bioinorganic chemistry ===
Mössbauer spectroscopy has been widely applied to bioinorganic chemistry, especially for the study of iron-containing proteins and enzymes. Often the technique is used to determine the oxidation state of iron. Examples of prominent iron-containing biomolecules are iron-sulfur proteins, ferritin, and hemes including the cytochromes. These studies are often supplemented by analysis of related model complexes. An area of particular interest is the characterization of intermediates involved in oxygen activation by iron proteins.

Vibrational spectra of ^{57}Fe-enriched biomolecules can be acquired using nuclear resonance vibrational spectroscopy (NRVS), in which the sample is scanned through a range of synchrotron-generated X-rays, centered at the Mössbauer absorbance frequency. Stokes and anti-Stokes peaks in the spectrum correspond to low-frequency vibrations, many below 600 cm^{−1} with some below 100 cm^{−1}.

=== Gravitational astronomy ===
The precision of measurement of the Mössbauer effect is such that a modified Mössbauer experiment has been considered as a way of detecting gravitational waves.

== Mössbauer spectrometers ==
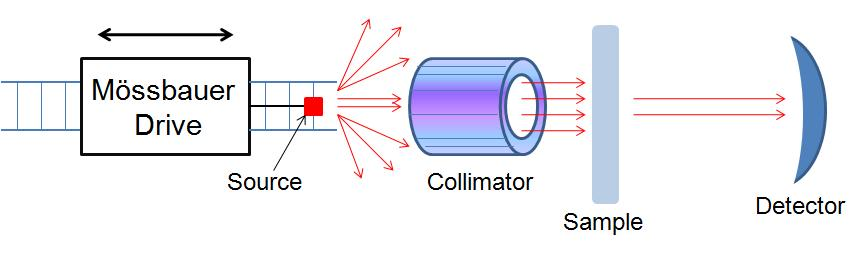
Fig. 5: A schematic view of a transmission-style Mössbauer spectrometer

A Mössbauer spectrometer is a device that performs Mössbauer spectroscopy, or a device that uses the Mössbauer effect to determine the chemical environment of Mössbauer nuclei present in the sample. It is formed by three main parts; a source that moves back and forth to generate a Doppler effect, a collimator that filters out non-parallel gamma rays and a detector.

A miniature Mössbauer Spectrometer, named (MB) MIMOS II, was used by the two rovers in NASA's Mars Exploration Rover missions.

== ^{57}Fe Mössbauer spectroscopy ==
The chemical isomer shift and quadrupole splitting are generally evaluated with respect to a reference material. For example, in iron compounds, the Mössbauer parameters were evaluated using iron foil (of a thickness less than 40 micrometers). The centroid of the six-line spectrum from metallic iron foil is −0.1 mm/s (for a Co/Rh source). All shifts in other iron compounds are computed relative to this −0.10 mm/s (at room temperature), i.e., in this case, isomer shifts are relative to the Co/Rh source. In other words, the centre point of the Mössbauer spectrum is zero. The shift values may also be reported relative to 0.0 mm/s; here, shifts are relative to the iron foil.

To calculate the outer line distance from the six-line iron spectrum:

$$V=\frac{c\,B_\text{int}\,\mu_{\rm N}}{E_\gamma}(3g_n^e+g_n)$$

where c is the speed of light, B_{int} is the internal magnetic field of the metallic iron (33 T), μ_{N} is the nuclear magneton (3.1524512605×10^{−8} eV/T), E_{γ} is the excitation energy (14.412497(3) keV), g_{n} is the ground state nuclear splitting factor (0.090604/(I), where Isospin I = 1/2) and g^{e}_{n} is the excited state splitting factor of ^{57}Fe (-0.15532/(I), where I = 3/2).

By substituting the above values one would get V = 10.6258 mm/s.

Other values are sometimes used to reflect different qualities of iron foils. In all cases, any change in V only affects the isomer shift and not the quadrupole splitting. As the IBAME, the authority for Mössbauer spectroscopy, does not specify a particular value, anything between 10.60 mm/s to 10.67 mm/s can be used. For this reason it is highly recommended to provide the isomer shift values relative to the source used, not to the iron foil, mentioning the details of the source (centre of gravity of the folded spectrum).

== See also ==
- Alpha-particle spectroscopy
- Gamma probe
- Gamma ray spectrometer
- Isomeric shift
- Liquid scintillation counting
- Mass spectrometry
- Mössbauer effect
- Nuclear isomer
- Nuclear resonance vibrational spectroscopy
- Pandemonium effect
- Perturbed angular correlation
- Scintillation counter
- Total absorption spectroscopy
- X-ray spectroscopy
