= Clover (detector) =

Type of gamma-ray detector

A clover detector is a gamma-ray detector that consists of four coaxial N-type high-purity germanium (Ge) crystals, each machined to shape and mounted in a common cryostat to form a structure resembling a four-leaf clover.

The clover is the first composite germanium detector. It remains widely used in the detectors of particle accelerators, where multiple clover modules form an array all around the target to capture the rays. More complex composite detectors, such as the 7-element hexagonal cluster detector used on the Euroball, offer even better data.

== Operation ==
A gamma ray may interact with a single germanium crystal and deposit its full energy. The resulting charge collected will then be proportional to this energy. However, through the process of Compton scattering, a gamma ray may interact with two (or possibly more) crystals, resulting in the energy (and thus the liberated charge) being shared by the crystals. In this case, a process known as add-back, where the charge collected by each of the crystals is summed, can be used to determine the energy of the incident gamma ray.

In addition to add-back, the clover also uses Compton suppression using a fence of BGO detectors. A gamma ray can escape the clover array via Compton scattering, causing incorrectly low charge values. A BGO detector can detect the escaped ray and have the computer ignore the wrong reading from the clover.

== Advantages ==
There are a number of advantages offered by using clover detectors as opposed to the more conventional single-crystal germanium detectors. Large-volume high-purity single crystals of germanium can be expensive. By mounting four smaller crystals in a common cryostat, a detector of a given volume can be created at a reduced cost. In addition, the individual smaller germanium crystals present a smaller solid angle than a large-volume germanium detector, thus significantly reducing the effects of Doppler broadening on the resulting spectra. Doppler broadening is further reduced using techniques that exploit the individual readings from the smaller crystals.

A clover detector can also be used to determine the electric or magnetic nature of the incident photons (such as whether the gamma ray is an electric quadrupole or a magnetic dipole) as the Compton scattering processes for these two types of radiation are different. This is called Compton polarimetry.
