= Kenneth John Frost =

American astrophysicist (1934–2013)

Kenneth J. Frost
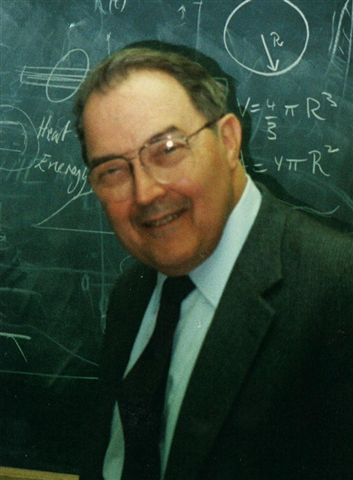
- Born: Kenneth John Frost; October 3, 1934; Brooklyn, New York, U.S.
- Died: August 5, 2013 (aged 78); Baltimore, Maryland, U.S.
- Education: BS (1957)
- Alma mater: Manhattan College; University of Rochester
- Occupation: Astrophysicist
- Known for: High-energy solar physics research. Active anticoincidence shielded spectrometers for X-ray and gamma-ray astronomy. X-ray Spectrometers on four Orbiting Solar Observatories (OSO-1, 2, 5, and 8) and on the Solar Maximum Mission (SMM) SMM Mission Scientist
- Scientific career
- Institutions: NASA Goddard Space Flight Center

Kenneth John Frost (October 3, 1934 – August 5, 2013) was a pioneer in the early space program, designing and flying instruments to detect and measure X-rays and gamma-rays in space, primarily from the Sun. He was the first to suggest the use of an active scintillation shield operated in electronic anticoincidence with the primary detector to reduce the background from cosmic ray interactions, an innovation that made sensitive hard X-ray and gamma-ray astronomy possible. He was an American astrophysicist at Goddard Space Flight Center working as a civil servant for the National Aeronautics and Space Administration. During his career, he was the project scientist of the Solar Maximum Mission, principal investigator of six science instruments, the head of the Solar Physics Branch, and the associate director of Space Sciences.

Frost received the John C. Lindsay Memorial Award in 1982 for his role as Project Scientist and one of the prime instigators of the Solar Maximum Mission (SMM). The Lindsay Award is Goddard's highest science award given each year "To recognize the Goddard employee who best exhibits the qualities of broad scientific accomplishments in the area of Space Science." It is named after John Lindsay, the man who hired Frost more than twenty years earlier and who was responsible for starting the series of Orbiting Solar Observatories (OSOs) that produced many of the advances in solar physics and astrophysics in the 1960s and '70s.

== Biography ==
Frost was born in Brooklyn, New York, on October 3, 1934, to Casimir and Edna Frost. He graduated in 1952 from Holy Trinity Diocesan High School (then in Brooklyn, now in Hicksville, NY) and obtained a Bachelor of Science degree from Manhattan College in New York City. He participated in the graduate program in the Physics Department of the University of Rochester in upstate New York for one year but left in 1958 before completing his PhD to take up a position with NASA. He was one of the early hires of this new agency and worked first at the Naval Research Laboratory and then at the newly opened Goddard Space Flight Center in Greenbelt, MD. He continued to work at Goddard for his whole career until retiring in 1997. He died, aged 78, on August 5, 2013, at the University of Maryland Medical Center's R Adams Cowley Shock Trauma Center from complications following a fall at his home in Annapolis, MD.

== NASA career ==
The Sun was Frost's primary focus initially, although he maintained an interest in all sources of high-energy X-ray and gamma-ray photons originating from anywhere in the universe. He led numerous flight instrument projects as principal investigator, specializing in X-ray and gamma-ray spectrometers. Frost also held the position of head of the Solar High Energy Branch for several years and later contributed to defining Goddard's involvement in early scientific endeavors aboard the Space Station. Eventually, he assumed the role of associate director of Space Sciences under Steve Holt, who served as director before Frost retired in 1997.

=== Science legacy ===
A total of 130 papers and presentations are listed in NASA ADS with Frost as co-author with 57 of them refereed and seven of these with him as lead author. Two of his papers have had lasting significance in advancing our understanding of solar flares. The most famous paper, published in 1971, is based on observations of a solar flare with Frost's instrument on the fifth Orbiting Solar Observatory (OSO-5) and presents "Evidence from Hard X-Rays for Two-Stage Particle Acceleration in a Solar Flare." It is still cited today with a total of 154 citations, with 5 in 2013 alone. A second paper, published in 1969 and entitled "Rapid Fine Structure in a Burst of Hard Solar X-Rays Observed by OSO-5," is less well known but still has 116 citations.

=== Science instruments ===
==== Active Anti-coincidence Spectrometers for X-ray and Gamma-ray Observations in Space ====
At the start of the space program in the late fifties and early sixties, there was the recognition that X-rays and gamma-rays, not detectable from the ground, offered a new window on the universe. These high-energy photons had the potential for enabling new scientific discoveries that could rival or exceed all that had been achieved previously with ground-based optical astronomy. Hence, there was a great demand for flying ever-improving X-ray and gamma-ray instruments to determine the intensity and spectrum of the emission from the Sun and other more distant cosmic sources of this radiation.

When the first attempts to detect X-rays and gamma-rays from the Sun, it was found that the background flux in space was of the same order of magnitude as the maximum theoretical estimates for the primary flux. Thus, any detector had to be capable of suppressing this background. Lead shielding to reject this background and provide angular collimation had proved unsuccessful since it generated its own background through interactions with cosmic rays. Frost was the first to suggest the use of an active scintillation shield around the X-ray/gamma-ray detector with the two connected in electronic anticoincidence to reject unwanted charged particle events and to provide the required angular collimation.

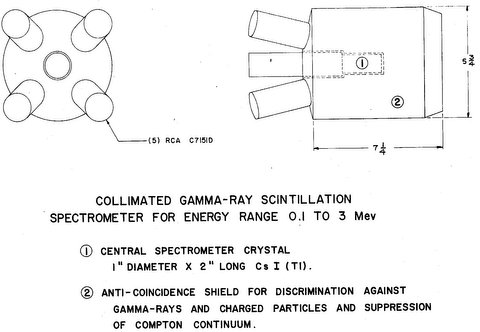
Drawing of an active anticoincidence collimated scintillation spectrometer designed for gamma-ray astronomy in the energy range from 0.1 to 3 MeV.

The proposed instrument is shown in the figure to the right.

Frost developed this design in collaboration with Laurence E. Peterson, then at the University of Minnesota, who had been working independently on a similar idea. Together they built an instrument of this type and flew it on a high-altitude balloon to near the top of the atmosphere over Minneapolis on June 10, 1962. They were able to demonstrate the instrument's performance and establish upper limits on the flux of gamma-rays from the quiet (non-flaring) Sun between 160 and 800 keV that were "considerably below those previously available."

Actively shielded X-ray and gamma-ray spectrometers of this type became the standard for making high sensitivity observations of solar and cosmic sources, and variations on this basic technique are still being used today.

==== The Orbiting Solar Observatory (OSO) Series ====
Frost was the PI for active anticoincidence spectrometers on four of the eight Orbiting Solar Observatories, namely the OSO-1, 2, 5, and 8. All the instruments were X-ray and gamma-ray spectrometers of the same basic design with an active anticoincidence collimator that Frost had originally suggested. Laurence E. Peterson at the University of California, San Diego (UCSD), Edward Chupp at the University of New Hampshire (UNH), and others, developed similar instruments that were flown on OSO-1, 3, and 7, so that there was an X ray and gamma-ray spectrometer on almost every one of the eight OSOs.

==== The Solar Maximum Mission (SMM) ====
Frost was the NASA Project Scientist for the Solar Maximum Mission (SMM) that was launched on 14 February 1980. In 1984, the project included the first recorded in-orbit repair using the Space Shuttle STS-41C. SMM continued to operate until re-entry into the Earth's atmosphere on 2 December 1989. It included seven instruments specifically selected to provide coordinated observations of solar activity, particularly solar flares and coronal mass ejections (CMEs). Frost was PI of the Hard X-Ray Burst Spectrometer (HXRBS) that measured the hard X-ray spectrum of thousands of solar flares with high time resolution. HXRBS observations became widely used as the primary indicator of energetic electrons in solar flares. Many scientists, including those outside the immediate PI team, used HXRBS X-ray time histories and spectra of the flares they were interested in. The observations confirmed the energetic importance of accelerated electrons in solar flares, and for a decade they became the standard measure of solar hard X-ray emission. The free access to HXRBS data greatly increased the influence and importance of this relatively simple spectrometer that was, in fact, the back-up unit from Frost's OSO-5 spectrometer flown some ten years earlier.

== Legacy ==
An important legacy of Frost is his contributions to the early days of solar physics observations from space. There are many other papers in the literature with important science results based on the analysis of data from Frost's instruments but his role is not always made clear. Frost achieved approval for a large number of scientific instruments being added to various OSO spacecraft. Thus, one of his greatest contributions is generally considered to be his advocacy role in solar physics. He devised and advocated for new instruments and new missions that could be successfully approved by the political process. Frost's greatest legacy to science was his role in instigating and ushering in the Solar Maximum Mission. While it did not achieve the goal he had hoped for of revealing a complete understanding of solar flares, it did set the foundation on which all future solar space missions depend.
