= Nuclear resonance vibrational spectroscopy =

Nuclear resonance vibrational spectroscopy is a synchrotron-based technique that probes vibrational energy levels. The technique, often called NRVS, is specific for samples that contain nuclei that respond to Mössbauer spectroscopy, most commonly iron. The method exploits the high resolution offered by synchrotron light sources, which enables the resolution of vibrational fine structure, especially those vibrations that are coupled to the position of the Fe centre(s). The method is popularly applied to problems in bioinorganic chemistry, materials science, and geophysics. A novel aspect of the method is the ability to determine the 3D-trajectory of iron atoms within vibrational modes, providing a unique appraisal of DFT-prediction accuracy. Other names for this method include nuclear inelastic scattering (NIS), nuclear inelastic absorption (NIA), nuclear resonant inelastic x-ray scattering (NRIXS), and phonon assisted Mössbauer effect.

== Experimental set-up ==
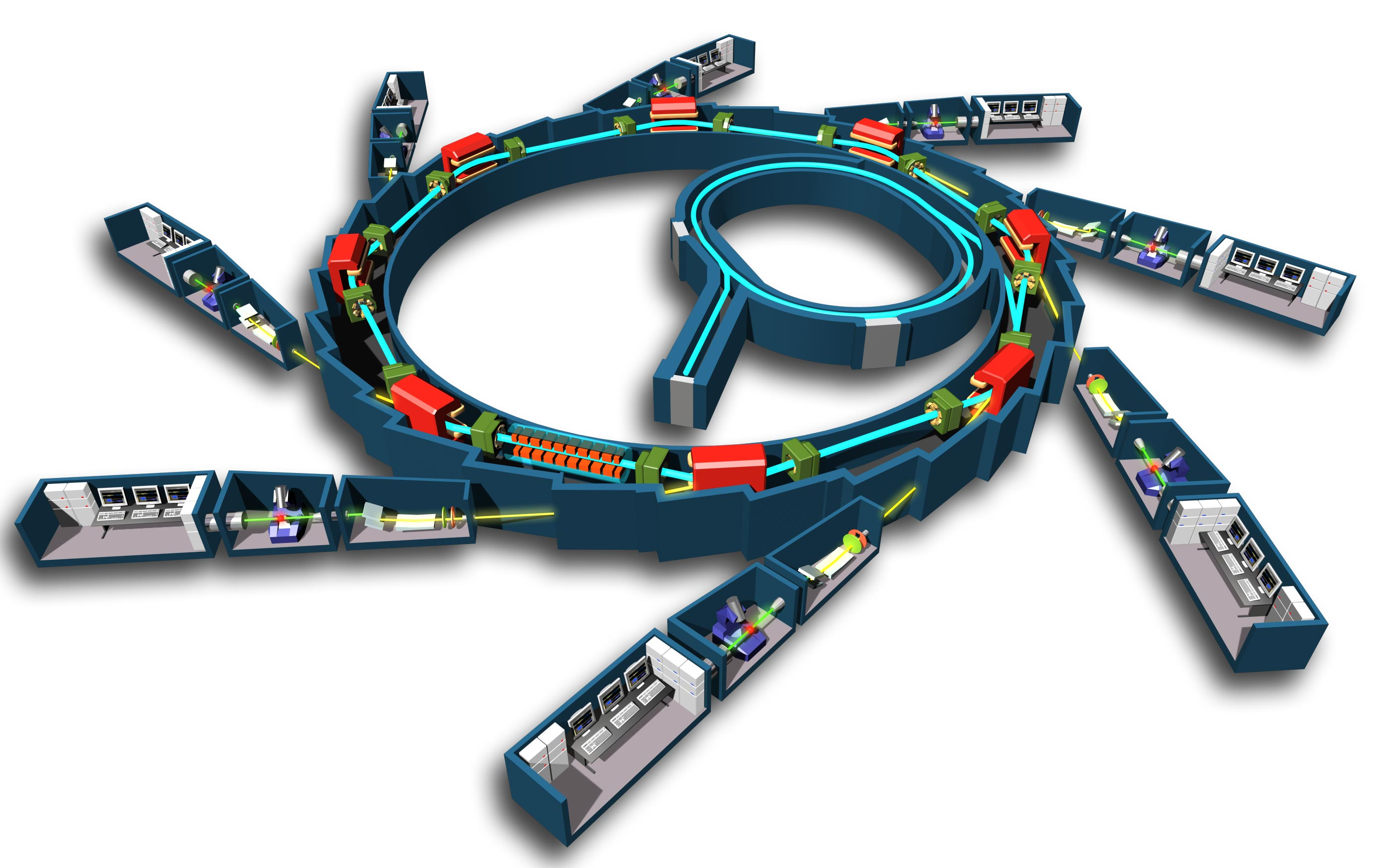
Schematic of a synchrotron, which provides the incident X-ray beams for this technique.

In the experimental setup, X-rays are released from the particle beam by an undulator; a high-resolution monochromator produces a beam with small energy dispersion (typically 1.0 meV). The sample is irradiated with photons chosen around the resonance of the Mössbauer isotope and further information is provided for the specific isotope. Typical parameters for the experimental scan are –20 meV below recoil-free resonance energy to +100 meV above it. The number of scans (often recorded for 5 seconds every 0.2 meV) depends on the amount of Mössbauer-active nuclei in the sample. The number of photons absorbed by the sample at any wavelength are measured by detecting the fluorescence emitted from the excited atom with an avalanche photodiode detector. The resulting raw spectrum contains a high-intensity resonance that corresponds to the nuclear excited state of the probed nucleus. For bulk samples, the technique detects natural abundance ^{57}Fe. For many dilute or biological samples, the sample is often enriched in ^{57}Fe.
