= Total absorption spectroscopy =

Gamma radiation measurement technique

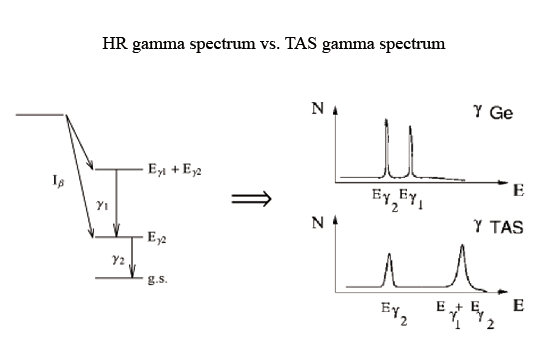
Hypothetical beta decay seen by high-resolution (germanium mainly) and TAS detectors. There is a change in philosophy when measuring with a TAS. With a germanium detector (Ge), the energy peaks corresponding to individual gammas are seen, but the TAS detector gives a spectrum of the levels populated in the decay (ideal TAS). The TAS detector has less resolution but higher efficiency.

Total absorption spectroscopy is a measurement technique that allows the measurement of the gamma radiation emitted in the different nuclear gamma transitions that may take place in the daughter nucleus after its unstable parent has decayed by means of the beta decay process. This technique can be used for beta decay studies related to beta feeding measurements within the full decay energy window for nuclei far from stability.

It is implemented with a special type of detector, the "total absorption spectrometer" (TAS), made of a scintillator crystal that almost completely surrounds the activity to be measured, covering a solid angle of approximately 4π. Also, in an ideal case, it should be thick enough to have a peak efficiency close to 100%, in this way its total efficiency is also very close to 100% (this is one of the reasons why it is called "total" absorption spectroscopy). Finally, it should be blind to any other type of radiation. The gamma rays produced in the decay under study are collected by photomultipliers attached to the scintillator material. This technique may solve the problem of the Pandemonium effect.

There is a change in philosophy when measuring with a TAS. Instead of detecting the individual gamma rays (as high-resolution detectors do), it will detect the gamma cascades emitted in the decay. Then, the final energy spectrum will not be a collection of different energy peaks coming from the different transitions (as can be expected in the case of a germanium detector), but a collection of peaks situated at an energy that is the sum of the different energies of all the gammas of the cascade emitted from each level. This means that the energy spectrum measured with a TAS will be in reality a spectrum of the levels of the nuclei, where each peak is a level populated in the decay. Since the efficiency of these detectors is close to 100%, it is possible to see the feeding to the high excitation levels that usually can not be seen by high-resolution detectors. This makes total absorption spectroscopy the best method to measure beta feedings and provide accurate beta intensity (I_{β}) distributions for complex decay schemes.

In an ideal case, the measured spectrum would be proportional to the beta feeding (I_{β}). But a real TAS has limited efficiency and resolution, and also the I_{β} has to be extracted from the measured spectrum, which depends on the spectrometer response. The analysis of TAS data is not simple: to obtain the strength from the measured data, a deconvolution process should be applied.

== Analysis method for TAS data ==
The complex analysis of the data measured with the TAS can be reduced to the solution of a linear problem:

d = Ri

given that it relates the measured data (d) with the feedings (i) from which the beta intensity distribution I_{β} can be obtained.

R is the response matrix of the detector (meaning the probability that a decay that feeds a certain level gives a count in certain bin of the spectrum). The function R depends on the detector but also of the particular level scheme that is being measured. To be able to extract the value of i from the data d the equation has to be inverted (this equation is also called the "inverse problem").

Unfortunately this can not be done easily because there is similar response to the feeding of adjacent levels when they are at high excitation energies where the level density is high. In other words, this is one of the so-called "ill-posed" problems, for which several sets of parameters can reproduce closely the same data set. Then, to find i, the response has to be obtained for which the branching ratios and a precise simulation of the geometry of the detector are needed. The higher the efficiency of the TAS used, the lower the dependence of the response on the branching ratios will be. Then it is possible to introduce the unknown branching ratios by hand from a plausible guess. A good guess can be calculated by means of the Statistical Model.

Then the procedure to find the feedings is iterative: using the expectation-maximization algorithm to solve the inverse problem, Then the procedure to find the feedings is iterative: using the expectation-maximization algorithm to solve the inverse problem, the feedings are extracted; if they don't reproduce the experimental data, it means that the initial guess of the branching ratios is wrong and has to be changed (of course, it is possible to play with other parameters of the analysis). Repeating this procedure iteratively in a reduced number of steps, the data is finally reproduced.

=== Branching ratio calculation ===
The best way to handle this problem is to keep a set of discrete levels at low excitation energies and a set of binned levels at high energies. The set at low energies is supposed to be known and can be taken from databases (for example, the [ENSDF] database, which has information from what has been already measured with the high resolution technique). The set at high energies is unknown and does not overlap with the known part. At the end of this calculation, the whole region of levels inside the Q value window (known and unknown) is binned.

At this stage of the analysis it is important to know the internal conversion coefficients for the transitions connecting the known levels. The internal conversion coefficient is defined as the number of de-excitations via e− emission over those via γ emission. If internal conversion takes place, the EM multipole fields of the nucleus do not result in the emission of a photon, instead, the fields interact with the atomic electrons and cause one of the electrons to be emitted from the atom. The gamma that would be emitted after the beta decay is missed, and the γ intensity decreases accordingly: IT = Iγ + Ie− = Iγ(1 + αe), so this phenomenon has to be taken into account in the calculation. Also, the x rays will be contaminated with those coming from the electron conversion process. This is important in electron capture decay, as it can affect the results of any x-ray gated spectra if the internal conversion is strong. Its probability is higher for lower energies and high multipolarities.

One of the ways to obtain the whole branching ratio matrix is to use the Statistical Nuclear Model. This model generates a binned branching ratio matrix from average level densities and average gamma strength functions. For the unknown part, average branching ratios can be calculated, for which several parameterizations may be chosen, while for the known part the information in the databases is used.

=== Response simulation ===
It is not possible to produce gamma sources that emit all the energies needed to calculate accurately the response of a TAS detector. For this reason, it is better to perform a Montecarlo simulation of the response. For this simulation to be reliable, the interactions of all the particles emitted in the decay (γ, e−/e+, Auger e, x rays, etc.) have to be modeled accurately, and the geometry and materials in the way of these particles have to be well reproduced. Also, the light production of the scintillator has to be included. The way to perform this simulation is explained in detail in paper by D. Cano-Ott et al. GEANT3 and GEANT4 are well suited for these kind of simulations.

If the scintillator material of the TAS detector suffers from a non proportionality in the light production, the peaks produced by a cascade will be displaced further for every increment in the multiplicity and the width of these peaks will be different from the width of single peaks with the same energy. This effect can be introduced in the simulation by means of a hyperbolic scintillation efficiency.

The simulation of the light production will widen the peaks of the TAS spectrum; however, this still does not reproduce the real width of the experimental peaks. During the measurement there are additional statistical processes that affect the energy collection and are not included in the Montecarlo. The effect of this is an extra widening of the TAS experimental peaks. Since the peaks reproduced with the Montecarlo do not have the correct width, a convolution with an empirical instrumental resolution distribution has to be applied to the simulated response.

Finally, if the data to be analyzed comes from electron capture events, a simulated gamma response matrix must be built using the simulated responses to individual monoenergetic γ rays of several energies. This matrix contains the information related to the dependence of the response function on the detector. To include also the dependence on the level scheme that is being measured, the above-mentioned matrix should be convoluted with the branching ratio matrix calculated previously. In this way, the final global response R is obtained.

== Ancillary detectors ==
An important thing to have in mind when using the TAS technique is that, if nuclei with short half-lifes are measured, the energy spectrum will be contaminated with the gamma cascades of the daughter nuclei produced in the decay chain. Normally the TAS detectors have the possibility to place ancillary detectors inside of them, to measure secondary radiation like X-rays, electrons or positrons. In this way it is possible to tag the other components of the decay during the analysis, allowing to separate the contributions coming from all the different nuclei (isobaric separation).

== TAS detectors in the world ==
=== TAS at ISOLDE ===
In 1970, a spectrometer consisting of two cylindrical NaI detectors of 15 cm diameter and 10 cm length was used at ISOLDE.

=== TAS at GSI ===
The TAS Measuring Station installed at the GSI had a tape transport system that allowed the collection of the ions coming out of the separator (they were implanted in the tape), and the transportation of those ions from the collection position to the center of the TAS for the measurement (by means of the movement of the tape). The TAS at this facility was made of a cylindrical NaI crystal of Φ = h = 35.6 cm, with a concentric cylindrical hole in the direction of the symmetry axis. This hole was filled by a plug detector (4.7x15.0 cm) with a holder that allowed the placement of ancillary detectors and two rollers for a tape.

=== Lucrecia measuring station ===
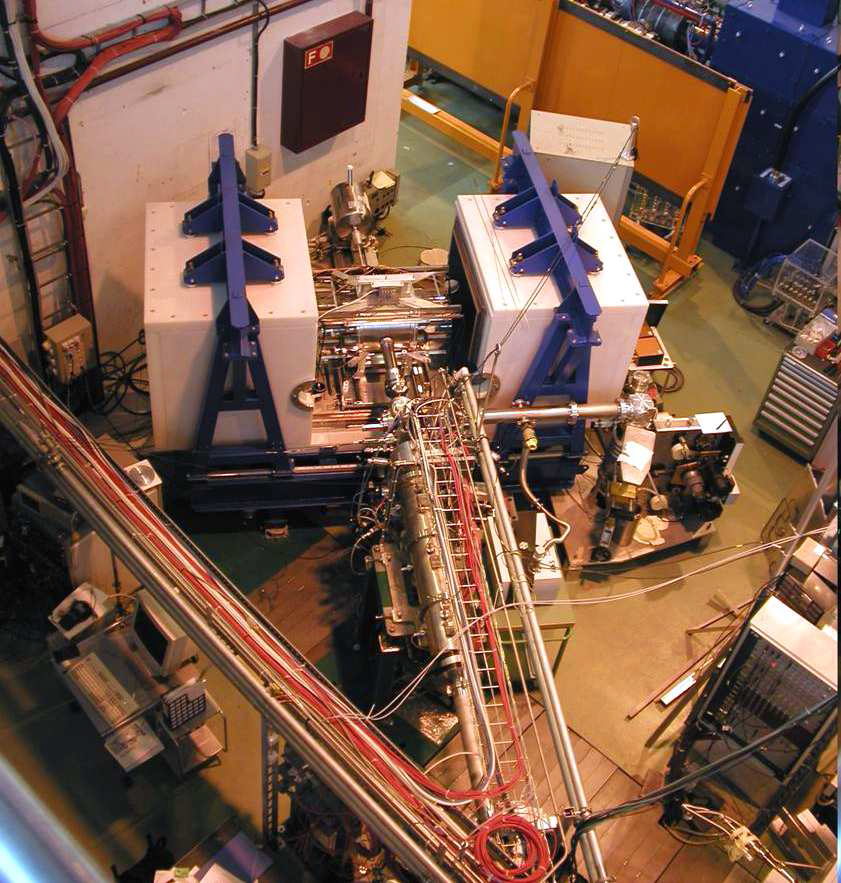
Lucrecia measuring station where the shielding can be seen in white as well as the beam line that delivers the radioactive species.

This measuring station, installed at the end of one of the ISOLDE beamlines, consists of a TAS, and a tape station.

In this station, a beam pipe is used to hold the tape. The beam is implanted in the tape outside of the TAS, which is then transported to the center of the detector for the measurement. In this station it is also possible to implant the beam directly in the center of the TAS, by changing the position of the rollers. The latter procedure allows the measurement of more exotic nuclei with very short half-lives.

Lucrecia is the TAS at this station. It is made of one piece of NaI(Tl) material cylindrically shaped with φ = h = 38 cm (the largest ever built to our knowledge). It has a cylindrical cavity of 7.5 cm diameter that goes through perpendicularly to its symmetry axis. The purpose of this hole is to allow the beam pipe to reach the measurement position so that the tape can be positioned in the center of the detector. It also allows the placement of ancillary detectors in the opposite side to measure other types of radiation emitted by the activity implanted in the tape (x rays, e−/e+, etc.). However, the presence of this hole makes this detector less efficient as compared to the GSI TAS (Lucrecia's total efficiency is around 90% from 300 to 3000 keV). Lucrecia's light is collected by 8 photomultipliers. During the measurements Lucrecia is kept measuring at a total counting rate not larger than 10 kHz to avoid second and higher order pileup contributions.

Surrounding the TAS there is a shielding box 19.2 cm thick made of four layers: polyethylene, lead, copper and aluminium. The purpose of it is to absorb most of the external radiation (neutrons, cosmic rays, and the room background).

== See also ==
- Pandemonium effect
- Scintillation counter
