= Compton edge =

Greatest energy a photon scattered on an electron can transfer to it

In gamma-ray spectrometry, the Compton edge is a feature of the measured gamma-ray energy spectrum that results from Compton scattering in the detector material. It corresponds to the highest energy that can be transferred to a weakly bound electron of a detector's atom by an incident photon in a single scattering process, and manifests itself as a ridge in the measured gamma-ray energy spectrum. It is a measurement phenomenon (meaning that the incident radiation does not possess this feature), which is particularly evident in gamma-ray energy spectra of monoenergetic photons.

When a gamma ray scatters within a scintillator or a semiconductor detector and the scattered photon escapes from the detector's volume, only a fraction of the incident energy is deposited in the detector. This fraction depends on the scattering angle of the photon, leading to a spectrum of energies corresponding to the entire range of possible scattering angles. The highest energy that can be deposited, corresponding to full backscatter, is called the Compton edge. In mathematical terms, the Compton edge is the inflection point of the high-energy side of the Compton region.

== Background ==
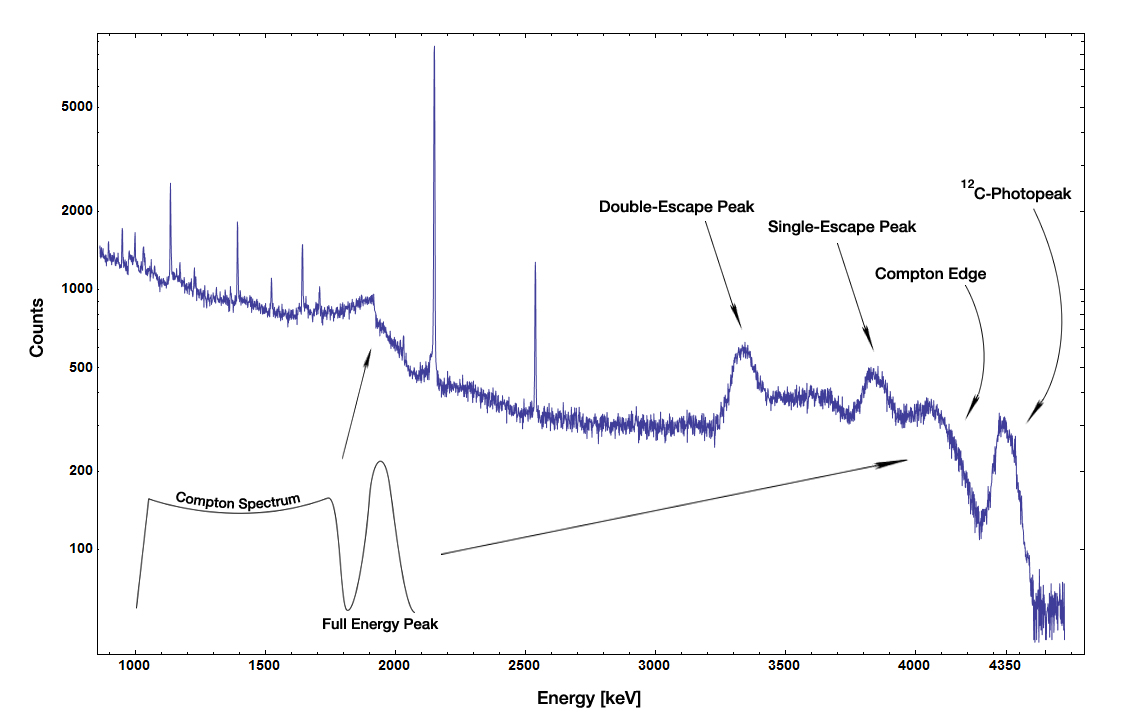
Gamma-ray spectrum of radioactive Am-Be source. The Compton continuum is due to scattering effects within the detector material. The highest energy that can be transferred by an incident photon in a single scattering process is referred to as the Compton edge. The photopeak after the Compton edge corresponds to the full deposition of the incident gamma-ray's energy (through a single process such as the photoelectric effect, or a sequence of various processes). Single- and double-escape peaks correspond to interactions involving pair production where the annihilation photons escape from the detector volume

In a Compton scattering process, an incident photon collides with a weakly bound electron, leading to its release from the atomic shell. The energy of the outgoing photon, E' , is given by the formula:

$$E^\prime = \frac{E}{1 + \frac{E}{m_{\text{e}} c^2}(1-\cos\theta)}$$

- E is the energy of the incident photon.
- $m_{\text{e}}$ is the mass of the electron.
- c is the speed of light.
- $\theta$ is the angle of deflection of the photon.

(note that the above formula does not account for the electron binding energy, which can play a non-negligible role for low-energy gamma rays).

The energy transferred to the electron, $E_T$, varies with the photon's scattering angle. For $\theta$ equal to zero there is no energy transfer, while the maximum energy transfer occurs for $\theta$ equal to 180 degrees (backscattering).

$E_T = E - E^\prime$

$$E_{\text{ComptonEdge}} = E_T (\text{max}) = E-\frac{E}{1 + \frac{2E}{m_{\text{e}} c^2}}$$

In a single scattering act, it is impossible for the photon to transfer any more energy via this process. Thus, there is a sharp cutoff at this energy, leading to the name Compton edge. If multiple photopeaks are present in the spectrum, each of them will have its own Compton edge. The part of the spectrum between the Compton edge and the photopeak is due to multiple subsequent Compton-scattering processes.

The continuum of energies corresponding to Compton scattered electrons is known as the Compton continuum.

== See also ==
- Gamma spectroscopy
- Compton suppression
