= Electronic anticoincidence =

Method of eliminating background events in particle physics

Electronic anticoincidence is a method (and its associated hardware) widely used to suppress unwanted, "background" events in high energy physics, experimental particle physics, gamma-ray spectroscopy, gamma-ray astronomy, experimental nuclear physics, and related fields.

In the typical case, a desired high-energy interaction or event occurs and is detected by some kind of detector, creating a fast electronic pulse in the associated nuclear electronics. But the desired events are mixed up with a significant number of other events, produced by other particles or processes, which create indistinguishable events in the detector. Very often it is possible to arrange other physical photon or particle detectors to intercept the unwanted background events, producing essentially simultaneous pulses that can be used with fast electronics to reject the unwanted background.

== Gamma-ray astronomy ==
Early experimenters in X-ray and gamma-ray astronomy found that their detectors, flown on balloons or sounding rockets, were corrupted by the large fluxes of high-energy photon and cosmic-ray charged-particle events. Gamma-rays, in particular, could be collimated by surrounding the detectors with heavy shielding materials made of lead or other such elements, but it was quickly discovered that the high fluxes of very penetrating high-energy radiation present in the near-space environment created showers of secondary particles that could not be stopped by reasonable shielding masses. To solve this problem, detectors operating above 10 or 100 keV were often surrounded by an active anticoincidence shield made of some other detector, which could be used to reject the unwanted background events.

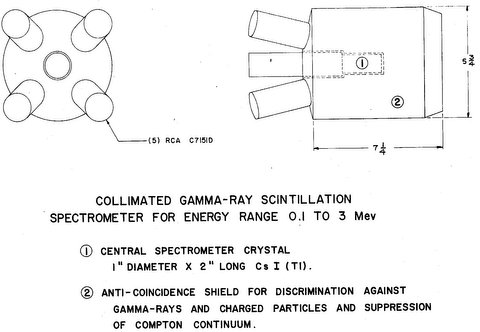
Drawing of an active anticoincidence collimated scintillation spectrometer designed for gamma-ray astronomy in the energy range from 0.1 to 3 MeV.

An early example of such a system, first proposed by Kenneth John Frost in 1962, is shown in the figure. It has an active CsI(Tl) scintillation shield around the X-ray/gamma-ray detector, also of CsI(Tl), with the two connected in electronic anticoincidence to reject unwanted charged particle events and to provide the required angular collimation.

Plastic scintillators are often used to reject charged particles, while thicker CsI, bismuth germanate ("BGO"), or other active shielding materials are used to detect and veto gamma-ray events of non-cosmic origin. A typical configuration might have a NaI scintillator almost completely surrounded by a thick CsI anticoincidence shield, with a hole or holes to allow the desired gamma rays to enter from the cosmic source under study. A plastic scintillator may be used across the front which is reasonably transparent to gamma rays, but efficiently rejects the high fluxes of cosmic-ray protons present in space.

== Compton suppression ==
In gamma-ray spectroscopy, Compton suppression is a technique that improves the signal by removing data that have been corrupted by the incident gamma ray getting Compton scattered out of the detector before depositing all of its energy. The goal is to minimize the background related to the Compton effect (Compton continuum) in the data.

The high-purity solid state germanium (HPGe) detectors used in gamma-ray spectroscopy have a typical size of a few centimeters in diameter and a thickness ranging from a few centimeters to a few millimeters. For detectors of such a size, gamma rays may Compton scatter out of the detector's volume before they deposit their entire energy. In this case, the energy reading by the data acquisition system will come up short: the detector records an energy which is only a fraction of the energy of the incident gamma ray.

In order to counteract this, the expensive and small high resolution detector is surrounded by larger and cheaper low resolution detectors, usually a scintillator (NaI and BGO are the most common) The suppression detector is shielded from the source by a thick collimator, and it is operated in anti-coincidence with the main detector: if they both detect a gamma ray, it must have scattered out of the main detector before depositing all of its energy, so the Ge reading is ignored. The cross section for interaction of gamma rays in the suppression detector is larger than that of the main detector, as is its size, thus it is highly unlikely that a gamma ray will escape both devices.

== Nuclear and particle physics ==
Modern experiments in nuclear and high-energy particle physics almost invariably use fast anticoincidence circuits to veto unwanted events. The desired events are typically accompanied by unwanted background processes that must be suppressed by enormous factors, ranging from thousands to many billions, to permit the desired signals to be detected and studied. Extreme examples of these kinds of experiments may be found at the Large Hadron Collider, where the enormous Atlas and CMS detectors must reject huge numbers of background events at very high rates, to isolate the very rare events being sought.

== See also ==
- Nuclear electronics
- HEAO 1
- HEAO 3
- INTEGRAL
- Uhuru (satellite)
- Gamma-ray spectroscopy
