= Multichannel analyzer =

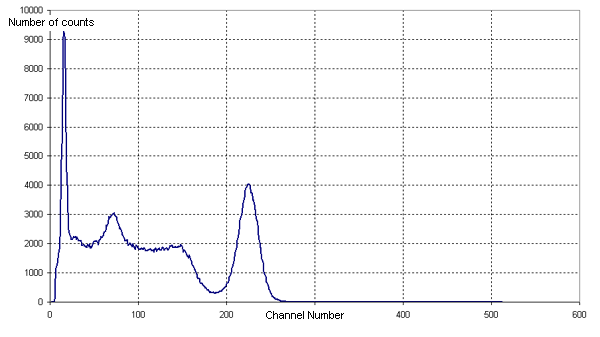
The output of an MCA used in pulse-height analysis mode to analyze a Cs-137 source

A multichannel analyzer (MCA) is an instrument used in laboratory and field applications to analyze an input signal consisting of voltage pulses. MCAs are used extensively in digitizing various spectroscopy measurements, especially those related to nuclear physics, including various types of spectroscopy (alpha-, beta-, and gamma spectroscopy).

== Operation ==
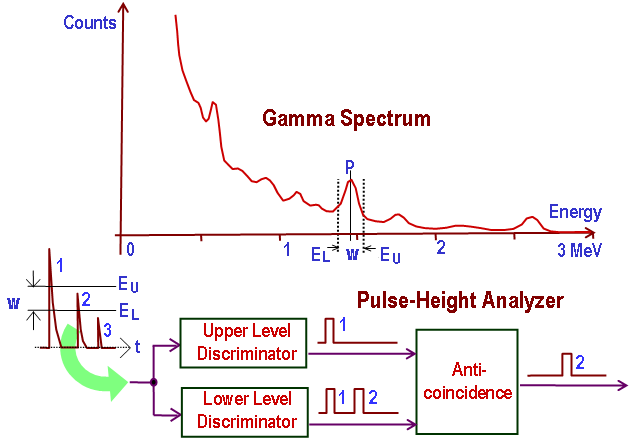
Pulse-Height Analyzer Principle: Three pulses, 1, 2, and 3 are detected at different times t. Two discriminators emit a counting signal if their set voltage threshold is exceeded by a pulse. Pulse 2 triggers the Lower Level E_{L} but not the Upper Level E_{U}. Pulse 2 is thus counted into the spectral region denoted as P. To ensure pulses are only counted into one channel, the anti-coincidence counter prevents Pulse 1 from being recorded into P.

A multichannel analyzer uses a fast ADC to record incoming pulses and stores information about pulses in one of two ways:

=== Pulse-height analysis ===
In pulse-height analysis (PHA) mode, incoming pulses are characterized based on their amplitude (peak voltage). The output spectrum is a histogram of these pulses, where the height of each channel corresponds to the number pulses counted within a narrow range of amplitudes. The resolution of the output spectrum depends on the number of channels of the MCA, which is on the order of a few thousand for typical instruments.

In alpha-, beta-, and gamma spectroscopy, PHA is used to measure the energy distribution of particles emitted in nuclear decay. Incoming particles are absorbed by a detector medium and excite voltage pulses whose amplitudes are proportional to their energy. After many pulses have been counted, the output spectrum shows the energy distribution of the radiation incident on the detector.

=== Multichannel scaling mode ===
In multichannel scaling (MCS) mode, the MCA records a pulse count-rate over time. Unlike PHA, MCS does not differentiate pulses of different amplitudes. Instead, the MCA records all measured counts in one channel for a set time interval (called the "dwell time"), then switches to the next channel to record the subsequent time interval, and so on.

The internal control voltage signal used to switch channels when the dwell time elapses is often available to the experimenter and can be used to trigger changes in the experimental setup. In this arrangement, the MCA acts as an X–Y recorder, observing changes in the count rate as a function of the controlled experimental parameter. For example, a Geiger counter connected to an MCA in MCS mode could be used to record the amount of ionizing radiation emitted by a neutron generator at different voltages.

== Output interface ==
Once a histogram has been recorded, the data is sent to a computer, displayed on a screen on the MCA, or (in older models) sent directly to a printer.

Modern MCAs typically interface with a computer via USB or Ethernet, but some older or specialty models use RS-232 or PCI.

== Sound card MCA ==
A USB sound card can serve as a cheap, consumer off-the-shelf ADC, a technique pioneered by Marek Dolleiser. The data is sent to the computer as normal sound and stored in a WAV file. Specialized software processes the "sound" to perform pulse-height analysis and multichannel scaling, forming a complete MCA.

Sound cards have high-resolution but low-speed (up to 192 kHz) ADC chips, allowing for reasonable gamma spectroscopy performance for a low-to-medium count rate. The "sound card spectrometer" has been further refined in amateur and professional circles.

== See also ==
- Geiger counter
- Oscilloscope
