= Pandemonium effect =

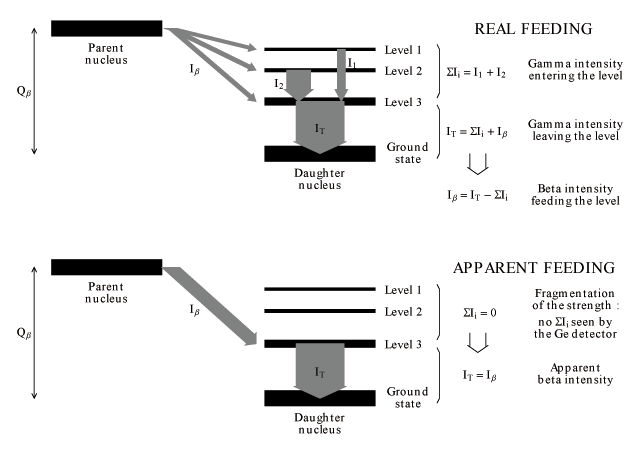
Schematic showing how the pandemonium effect can affect the results in an imaginary decay to a nucleus that has 3 levels. If this effect is large, feeding to high-lying levels is not detected, and more beta feeding is assigned to the low-lying energy levels.

The pandemonium effect is a problem that may appear when high-resolution detectors (usually germanium semiconductor detectors) are used in beta decay studies. It can affect the correct determination of the feeding to the different levels of the daughter nucleus. It was first introduced in 1977.

== Context ==
Typically, when a parent nucleus beta-decays into its daughter, there is some final energy available which is shared between the final products of the decay. This is called the Q value of the beta decay (Q_{β}). The daughter nucleus doesn't necessarily end up in the ground state after the decay, this only happens when the other products have taken all the available energy with them (usually as kinetic energy). So, in general, the daughter nucleus keeps an amount of the available energy as excitation energy and ends up in an excited state associated to some energy level, as seen in the picture. The daughter nucleus can only stay in that excited state for a small amount of time (the half life of the level) after which it suffers a series of gamma transitions to its lower energy levels. These transitions allow the daughter nucleus to emit the excitation energy as one or more gamma rays until it reaches its ground state, thus getting rid of all the excitation energy that it kept from the decay.

According to this, the energy levels of the daughter nucleus can be populated in two ways:

- by direct beta feeding from the beta decay of the parent into the daughter (I_{β}),
- by gamma transitions of higher energy levels (previously beta-populated from the direct beta decay of the parent) into lower energy levels (ΣI_{i}).

The total gamma rays emitted by an energy level (I_{T}) should be equal to the sum of these two contributions, that is, direct beta feeding (I_{β}) plus upper-level gamma de-excitations (ΣI_{i}).

I_{T} = I_{β} + ΣI_{i} (neglecting internal conversion)

The beta feeding I_{β} (that is, how many times a level is populated by direct feeding from the parent) can not be measured directly. Since the only magnitude that can be measured are the gamma intensities ΣI_{i} and I_{T} (that is, the amount of gammas emitted by the daughter with a certain energy), the beta feeding has to be extracted indirectly by subtracting the contribution from gamma de-excitations of higher energy levels (ΣI_{i}) to the total gamma intensity that leaves the level (I_{T}), that is:

I_{β} = I_{T} − ΣI_{i} (I_{T} and ΣI_{i} can be measured)

== Description ==
The pandemonium effect appears when the daughter nucleus has a large Q value, allowing the access to many nuclear configurations, which translates in many excitation-energy levels available. This means that the total beta feeding will be fragmented, because it will spread over all the available levels (with a certain distribution given by the strength, the level densities, the selection rules, etc.). Then, the gamma intensity emitted from the less populated levels will be weak, and it will be weaker as we go to higher energies where the level density can be huge. Also, the energy of the gammas de-excitating this high-density-level region can be high.

Measuring these gamma rays with high-resolution detectors may present two problems:

1. First, these detectors have a very low efficiency of the order of 1–5%, and will be blind to a weak gamma radiation in most of the cases.
2. Second, their efficiency curve drops to very low values as it goes to higher energies, starting from energies of the order of 1–2 MeV. This means that most of the information coming from gamma rays of huge energies will be lost.

These two effects reduce how much of the beta feeding to the higher energy levels of the daughter nucleus is detected, so less ΣI_{i} is subtracted from the I_{T}, and the energy levels are incorrectly assigned more I_{β} than present:

ΣI_{i} ~ 0, → I_{T} ≈ I_{β}

When this happens, the low-lying energy levels are the more affected ones. Some of the level schemes of nuclei that appear in the nuclear databases suffer from this Pandemonium effect and are not reliable until better measurements are made in the future.

== Possible solutions ==
To avoid the pandemonium effect, a detector that solves the problems that high-resolution detectors present should be used. It needs to have an efficiency close to 100% and a good efficiency for gamma rays of huge energies. One possible solution is to use a calorimeter like the total absorption spectrometer (TAS), which is made of a scintillator material. It has been shown that even with a high-efficiency array of germanium detectors in a close geometry (for example, the cluster cube array), about 57% of the total B(GT) observed with the TAS technique is lost.

== Relevance ==
The calculation of the beta feeding, (I_{β}) is important for different applications, like the calculation of the residual heat in nuclear reactors or nuclear structure studies.

== See also ==
- Gamma-ray spectrometer
- Gamma spectroscopy
- Total absorption spectroscopy
