= Q value (nuclear science) =

Amount of energy absorbed/released in a nuclear reaction

In nuclear physics and chemistry, the Q value for a nuclear reaction is the amount of energy absorbed or released during the reaction. The value relates to the enthalpy of a chemical reaction or the energy of radioactive decay products. It can be determined from the masses of reactants and products:

$$Q = (m_\text{r} - m_\text{p}) \times \mathrm{0.9315~GeV/Da},$$

where $m_\text{r}$ and $m_\text{p}$ are the sums of the reactant and product masses.

Q values affect reaction rates. In general, the larger the positive Q value for the reaction, the faster the reaction proceeds, and the more likely the reaction is to "favor" the products.

== Definition ==
The conservation of energy, between the initial and final energy of a nuclear process $(E_\text{i} = E_\text{f}),$ enables the general definition of Q based on the mass–energy equivalence. For any radioactive particle decay, the kinetic energy difference will be given by

$$Q = K_\text{f} - K_\text{i} = (m_\text{i} - m_\text{f}) \, c^2,$$

where K denotes the kinetic energy of the mass m. A reaction with a positive Q value is exothermic, i.e. has a net release of energy, since the kinetic energy of the final state is greater than the kinetic energy of the initial state. A reaction with a negative Q value is endothermic, i.e. requires a net energy input, since the kinetic energy of the final state is less than the kinetic energy of the initial state. Observe that a chemical reaction is exothermic when it has a negative enthalpy of reaction, in contrast a positive Q value in a nuclear reaction.

The Q value can also be expressed in terms of the Mass excess $\Delta M$ of the nuclear species as

$$Q = \Delta M_\text{i} - \Delta M_\text{f}.$$

Proof
The mass of a nucleus can be written as $M = A u + \Delta M$, where $A$ is the mass number (sum of number of protons and neutrons), and $u = m(\ce{^12C})/12 = \mathrm{931.494~MeV}/c^2.$ Note that the count of nucleons is conserved in a nuclear reaction. Hence, $A_\text{f} = A_\text{i},$ and $Q = \Delta M_\text{i} - \Delta M_\text{f}.$

== Applications ==
Chemical Q values are measurement in calorimetry. Exothermic chemical reactions tend to be more spontaneous and can emit light or heat, resulting in runaway feedback(i.e. explosions).

Q values are also featured in particle physics. For example, Sargent's rule states that weak reaction rates are proportional to Q^{5}. The Q value is the kinetic energy released in the decay at rest. For neutron decay, some mass disappears as neutrons convert to a proton, electron and antineutrino:

$$Q = (m_\text{n} - m_\text{p} - m_{\overline\nu} - m_\text{e}) c^2 =
K_\text{p} + K_\text{e} + K_{\overline\nu} = 0.782~\text{MeV},$$

where m_{n} is the mass of the neutron, m_{p} is the mass of the proton, m_{ν̅} is the mass of the electron antineutrino, m_{e} is the mass of the electron, and the K are the corresponding kinetic energies. The neutron has no initial kinetic energy since it is at rest. In beta decay, a typical Q is around 1 MeV.

The decay energy is divided among the products in a continuous distribution for more than two products. Measuring this spectrum allows one to find the mass of a product. Experiments are studying emission spectra to search for neutrinoless decay and neutrino mass; this is the principle of the ongoing KATRIN experiment.

== See also ==
- Binding energy
- Calorimeter (particle physics)
- Decay energy
- Fusion energy gain factor
- Pandemonium effect
- OZI rule
