= Radiation protection =

Range of safety measures

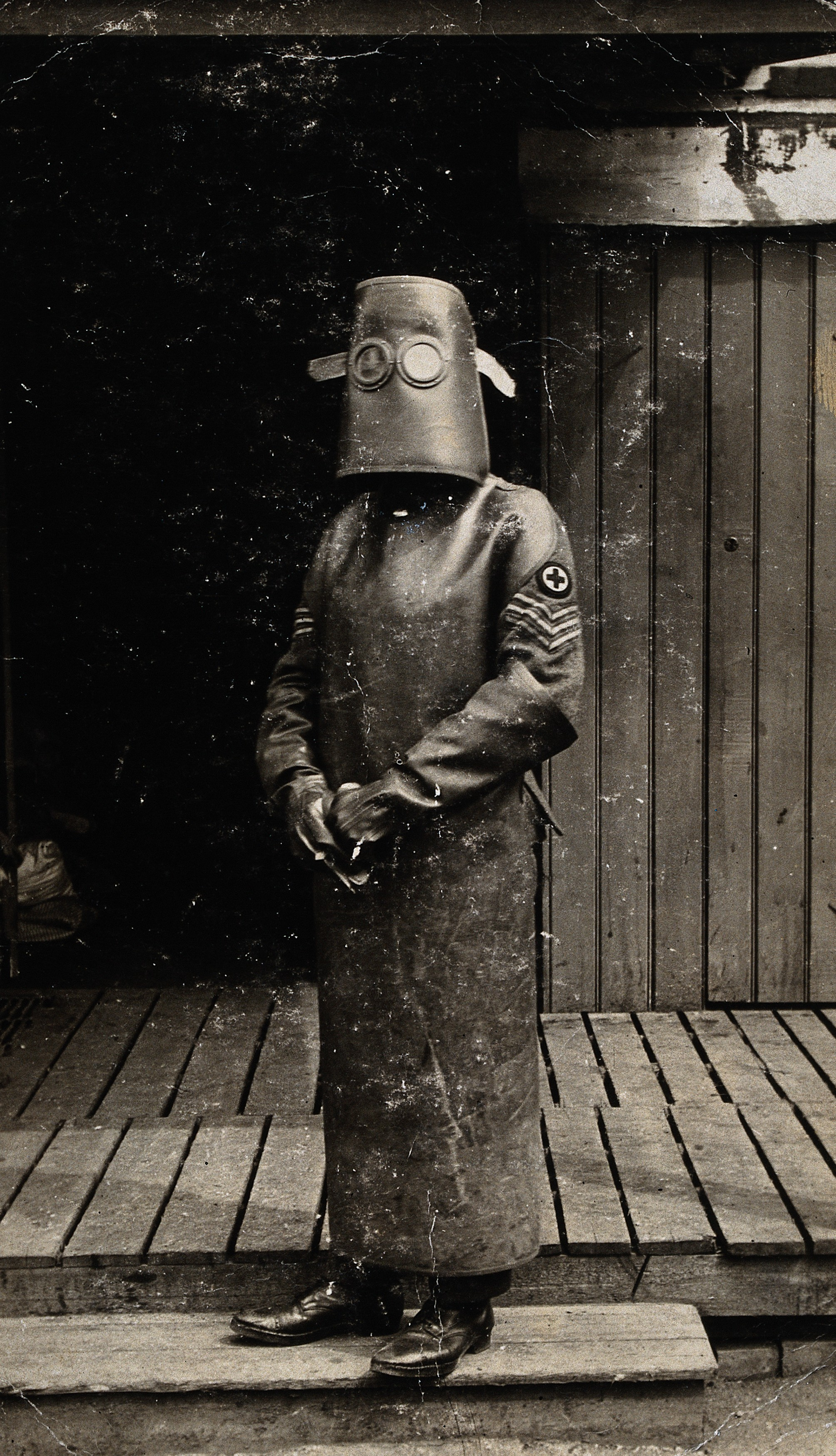
A radiographer in World War I wearing protective clothing and headpiece

Radiation protection, also known as radiological protection, is defined by the International Atomic Energy Agency (IAEA) as "The protection of people from harmful effects of exposure to ionizing radiation, and the means for achieving this". Exposure can be from a source of radiation external to the human body or due to internal irradiation caused by the ingestion of radioactive contamination.

Ionizing radiation is widely used in industry and medicine, and can present a significant health hazard by causing microscopic damage to living tissue. There are two main categories of ionizing radiation health effects. At high exposures, it can cause "tissue" effects, also called "deterministic" effects due to the certainty of them happening, conventionally indicated by the unit gray and resulting in acute radiation syndrome. For low level exposures there can be statistically elevated risks of radiation-induced cancer, called "stochastic effects" due to the uncertainty of them happening, conventionally indicated by the unit sievert.

Fundamental to radiation protection is the avoidance or reduction of dose using the simple protective measures of time, distance and shielding. The duration of exposure should be limited to that necessary, the distance from the source of radiation should be maximised, and the source or the target shielded wherever possible. To measure personal dose uptake in occupational or emergency exposure, for external radiation personal dosimeters are used, and for internal dose due to ingestion of radioactive contamination, bioassay techniques are applied.

For radiation protection and dosimetry assessment the International Commission on Radiation Protection (ICRP) and International Commission on Radiation Units and Measurements (ICRU) publish recommendations and data which is used to calculate the biological effects on the human body of certain levels of radiation, and thereby advise acceptable dose uptake limits.

== Principles ==
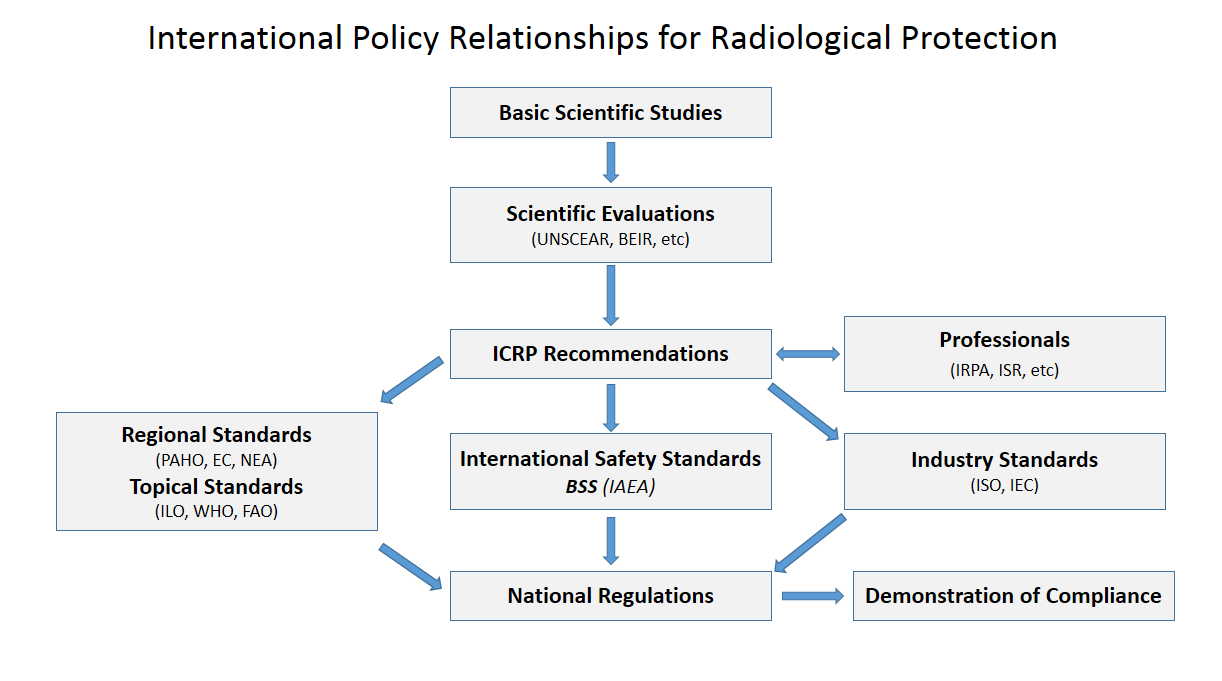
International policy relationships in radiological protection. The ICRP is generally recognised by regulators as the International authority on good practice

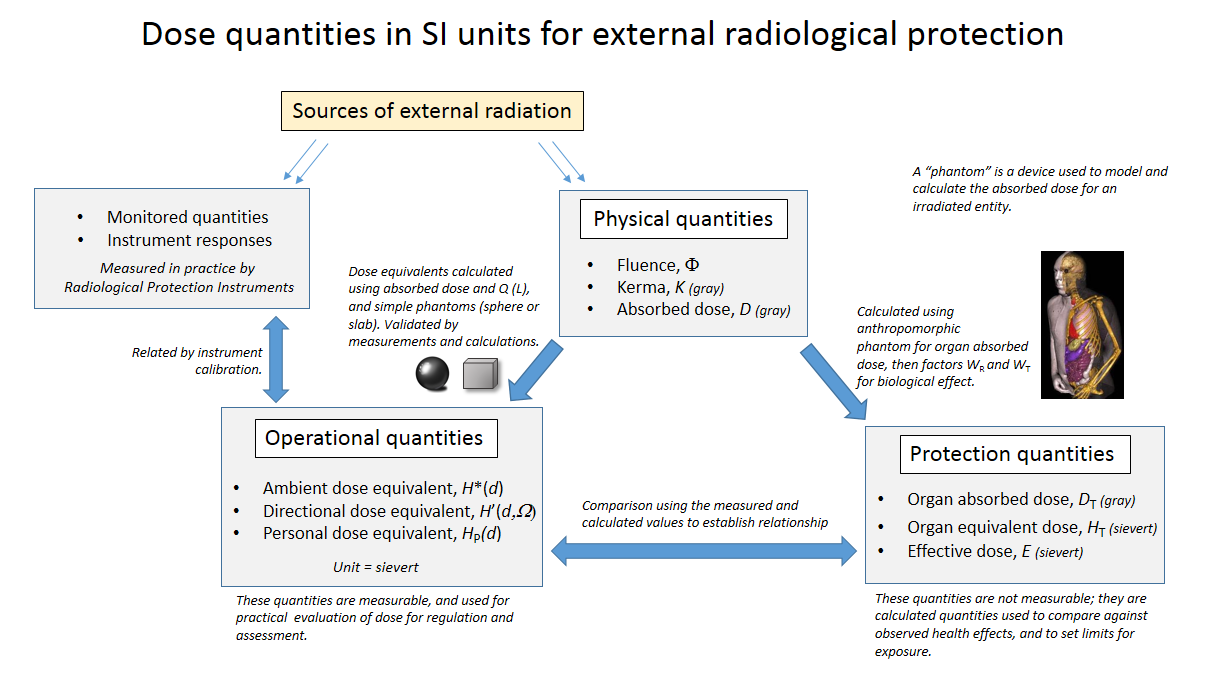
External dose quantities used in radiation protection and dosimetry - based on ICRU report 57

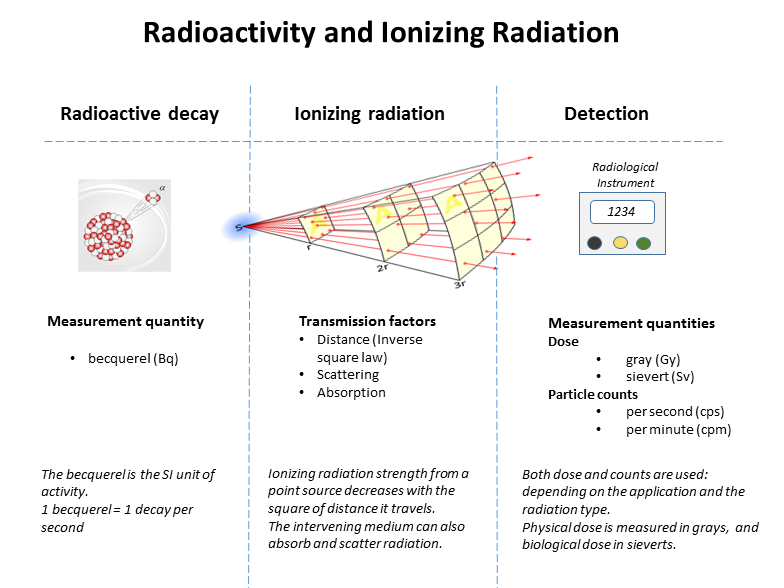
Graphic showing relationships between radioactivity and detected ionizing radiation

The ICRP recommends, develops and maintains the International System of Radiological Protection, based on evaluation of the large body of scientific studies available to equate risk to received dose levels. The system's health objectives are "to manage and control exposures to ionising radiation so that deterministic effects are prevented, and the risks of stochastic effects are reduced to the extent reasonably achievable".

The ICRP's recommendations flow down to national and regional regulators, which have the opportunity to incorporate them into their own law; this process is shown in the accompanying block diagram. In most countries a national regulatory authority works towards ensuring a secure radiation environment in society by setting dose limitation requirements that are generally based on the recommendations of the ICRP.

=== Exposure situations ===
The ICRP recognises planned, emergency, and existing exposure situations, as described below;

- Planned exposure – defined as "...where radiological protection can be planned in advance, before exposures occur, and where the magnitude and extent of the exposures can be reasonably predicted." These are such as in occupational exposure situations, where it is necessary for personnel to work in a known radiation environment.
- Emergency exposure – defined as ".....unexpected situations that may require fast protective actions". This would be such as an emergency nuclear event.
- Existing exposure – defined as "...being those that already exist when a decision on control has to be taken". These can be such as from naturally occurring radioactive materials which exist in the environment.

=== Regulation of dose uptake ===
The ICRP uses the following overall principles for all controllable exposure situations.

- Justification: No unnecessary use of radiation is permitted, which means that the advantages must outweigh the disadvantages.
- Limitation: Each individual must be protected against risks that are too great, through the application of individual radiation dose limits.
- Optimization: This process is intended for application to those situations that have been deemed to be justified. It means "the likelihood of incurring exposures, the number of people exposed, and the magnitude of their individual doses" should all be kept As Low As Reasonably Achievable (or Reasonably Practicable) known as ALARA or ALARP. It takes into account economic and societal factors.

=== Factors in external dose uptake ===
There are three factors that control the amount, or dose, of radiation received from a source. Radiation exposure can be managed by a combination of these factors:

1. Time: Reducing the time of an exposure reduces the effective dose proportionally. An example of reducing radiation doses by reducing the time of exposures might be improving operator training to reduce the time they take to handle a radioactive source.
2. Distance: Increasing distance reduces dose due to the inverse square law. Distance can be as simple as handling a source with forceps rather than fingers. For example, if a problem arises during a fluoroscopy, step away from the patient if feasible.
3. Shielding: Sources of radiation can be shielded with solid or liquid material, which absorbs the energy of the radiation. The term 'biological shield' is used for absorbing material placed around a nuclear reactor, or other source of radiation, to reduce the radiation to a level safe for humans. The shielding materials are concrete and lead shield which is 0.25 mm thick for secondary radiation and 0.5 mm thick for primary radiation

=== Internal dose uptake ===
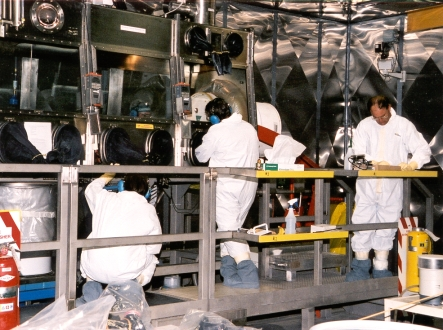
Large scale glovebox in the nuclear industry used to contain airborne radioactive particles.

Internal dose, due to the inhalation or ingestion of radioactive substances, can result in stochastic or deterministic effects, depending on the amount of radioactive material ingested and other biokinetic factors.

The risk from a low level internal source is represented by the dose quantity committed dose, which has the same risk as the same amount of external effective dose.

The intake of radioactive material can occur through four pathways:

- inhalation of airborne contaminants such as radon gas and radioactive particles
- ingestion of radioactive contamination in food or liquids
- absorption of vapours such as tritium oxide through the skin
- injection of medical radioisotopes such as technetium-99m

The occupational hazards from airborne radioactive particles in nuclear and radio-chemical applications are greatly reduced by the extensive use of gloveboxes to contain such material. To protect against breathing in radioactive particles in ambient air, respirators with particulate filters are worn.

To monitor the concentration of radioactive particles in ambient air, radioactive particulate monitoring instruments measure the concentration or presence of airborne materials.

For ingested radioactive materials in food and drink, specialist laboratory radiometric assay methods are used to measure the concentration of such materials.

=== Recommended limits on dose uptake ===
Various doses of radiation in sieverts, ranging from trivial to lethal.

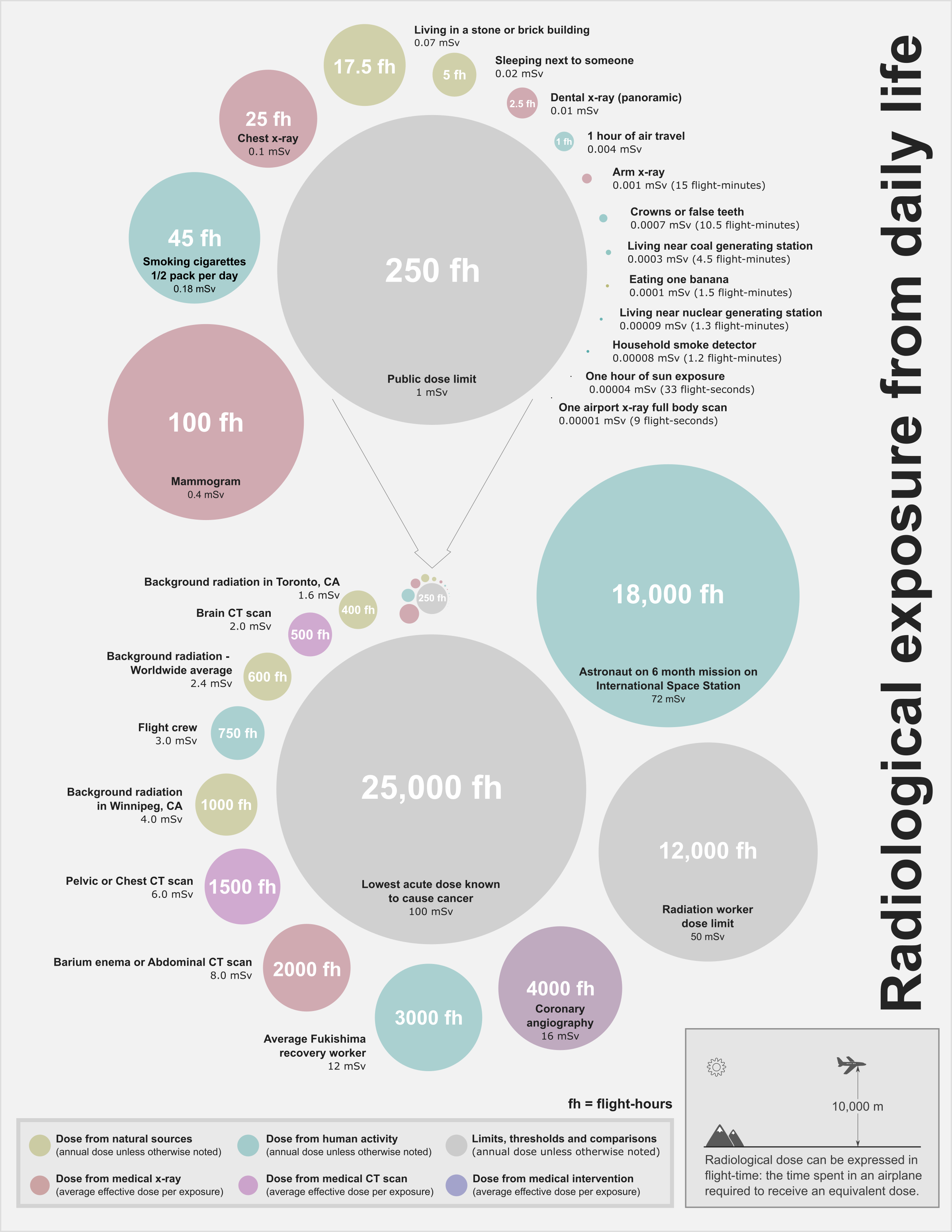
Visual comparison of radiological exposure from daily life activities.

The ICRP recommends a number of limits for dose uptake in table 8 of ICRP report 103. These limits are "situational", for planned, emergency and existing situations. Within these situations, limits are given for certain exposed groups;

- Planned exposure – limits given for occupational, medical and public exposure. The occupational exposure limit of effective dose is 20 mSv per year, averaged over defined periods of 5 years, with no single year exceeding 50 mSv. The public exposure limit is 1 mSv in a year.
- Emergency exposure – limits given for occupational and public exposure
- Existing exposure – reference levels for all persons exposed

The public information dose chart of the USA Department of Energy, shown here on the right, applies to USA regulation, which is based on ICRP recommendations. Note that examples in lines 1 to 4 have a scale of dose rate (radiation per unit time), whilst 5 and 6 have a scale of total accumulated dose.

=== ALARP & ALARA ===
ALARP is an acronym for an important principle in exposure to radiation and other occupational health risks and in the UK stands for As Low As Reasonably Practicable. The aim is to minimize the risk of radioactive exposure or other hazard while keeping in mind that some exposure may be acceptable in order to further the task at hand. The equivalent term ALARA, As Low As Reasonably Achievable, is more commonly used outside the UK.

This compromise is well illustrated in radiology. The application of radiation can aid the patient by providing doctors and other health care professionals with a medical diagnosis, but the exposure of the patient should be reasonably low enough to keep the statistical probability of cancers or sarcomas (stochastic effects) below an acceptable level, and to eliminate deterministic effects (e.g. skin reddening or cataracts). An acceptable level of incidence of stochastic effects is considered to be equal for a worker to the risk in other radiation work generally considered to be safe.

This policy is based on the principle that any amount of radiation exposure, no matter how small, can increase the chance of negative biological effects such as cancer. It is also based on the principle that the probability of the occurrence of negative effects of radiation exposure increases with cumulative lifetime dose. These ideas are combined to form the linear no-threshold model which says that there is not a threshold at which there is an increase in the rate of occurrence of stochastic effects with increasing dose. At the same time, radiology and other practices that involve use of ionizing radiation bring benefits, so reducing radiation exposure can reduce the efficacy of a medical practice. The economic cost, for example of adding a barrier against radiation, must also be considered when applying the ALARP principle. Computed tomography, better known as CT scans or CAT scans have made an enormous contribution to medicine, however not without some risk. The ionizing radiation used in CT scans can lead to radiation-induced cancer. Age is a significant factor in risk associated with CT scans, and in procedures involving children and systems that do not require extensive imaging, lower doses are used.

== Personal radiation dosimeters ==
The radiation dosimeter is an important personal dose measuring instrument. It is worn by the person being monitored and is used to estimate the external radiation dose deposited in the individual wearing the device. They are used for gamma, X-ray, beta and other strongly penetrating radiation, but not for weakly penetrating radiation such as alpha particles. Traditionally, film badges were used for long-term monitoring, and quartz fibre dosimeters for short-term monitoring. However, these have been mostly superseded by thermoluminescent dosimetry (TLD) badges and electronic dosimeters. Electronic dosimeters can give an alarm warning if a preset dose threshold has been reached, enabling safer working in potentially higher radiation levels, where the received dose must be continually monitored.

Workers exposed to radiation, such as radiographers, nuclear power plant workers, doctors using radiotherapy, those in laboratories using radionuclides, and HAZMAT teams are required to wear dosimeters so a record of occupational exposure can be made. Such devices are generally termed "legal dosimeters" if they have been approved for use in recording personnel dose for regulatory purposes.

Dosimeters can be worn to obtain a whole body dose and there are also specialist types that can be worn on the fingers or clipped to headgear, to measure the localised body irradiation for specific activities.

Common types of wearable dosimeters for ionizing radiation include:

- Film badge dosimeter
- Quartz fibre dosimeter
- Electronic personal dosimeter
- Thermoluminescent dosimeter

== Radiation protection ==
Diagram showing various forms of ionizing radiation, and the sort of material that is used to stop or reduce that type.

The total absorption coefficient of lead (atomic number 82) for gamma rays, plotted versus gamma energy, and the contributions by the three effects. Here, the photoelectric effect dominates at low energy. Above 5 MeV, pair production starts to dominate.

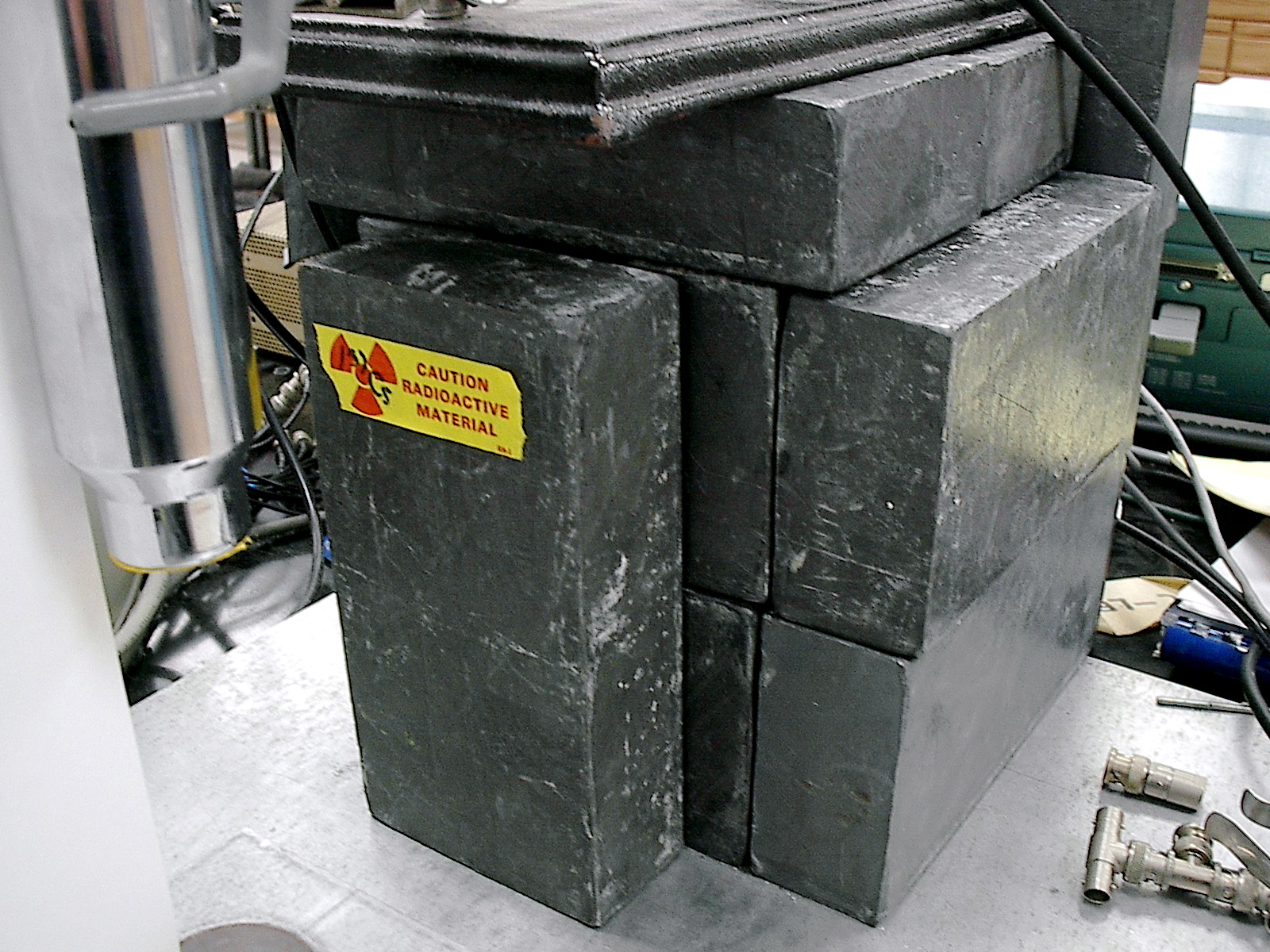
A lead castle built to shield a radioactive sample in a lab, being a form of lead shielding.

Different types of ionizing radiation interact in different ways with shielding material. Different shielding techniques are therefore used depending on the application, the type and energy of the radiation.

Shielding reduces the intensity of radiation, increasing with thickness. The dose decreases exponentially with the thickness of the shielding material. The shielding value of a material is typically indicated by a parameter called the "half-value layer", i.e. the thickness required to halve the dose, for a given radiation type (eg α, β or γ) and energy. For example, a practical shield in a fallout shelter with ten layers of packed dirt, each as thick as the material's half-value layer for that radiation, will reduce the dose to 1/1024 of its original intensity (i.e. 2^{−10}). Almost any material may provide an adequate radiation shield if used in sufficient thickness.

The effectiveness of a shielding material in general increases with its atomic number (Z), except for neutron shielding, which is more readily shielded by the likes of neutron absorbers and moderators such as compounds of boron (e.g. boric acid), cadmium, carbon and hydrogen.

Graded-Z shielding is a laminate of several materials with different Z values (atomic numbers) designed to protect against different types of ionizing radiation. Compared to single-material shielding, the same mass of graded-Z shielding has been shown to reduce electron penetration over 60%. It is commonly used in satellite-based particle detectors, offering several benefits:

- protection from radiation damage
- reduction of background noise for detectors
- lower mass compared to single-material shielding

Designs vary, but typically involve a gradient from high-Z (usually tantalum) through successively lower-Z elements such as tin, steel, and copper, usually ending with aluminium. Sometimes even lighter materials such as polypropylene or boron carbide are used.

In a typical graded-Z shield, the high-Z layer effectively scatters protons and electrons. It also absorbs gamma rays, which produces X-ray fluorescence. Each subsequent layer absorbs the X-ray fluorescence of the previous material, eventually reducing the energy to a suitable level. Each decrease in energy produces Bremsstrahlung and Auger electrons, which are below the detector's energy threshold. Some designs also include an outer layer of aluminium, which may simply be the skin of the satellite. The effectiveness of a material as a biological shield is related to its cross-section for scattering and absorption, and to a first approximation is proportional to the total mass of material per unit area interposed along the line of sight between the radiation source and the region to be protected. Hence, shielding strength or "thickness" is conventionally measured in units of g/cm^{2}. The radiation that manages to get through falls exponentially with the thickness of the shield. In x-ray facilities, walls surrounding the room with the x-ray generator may contain lead shielding such as lead sheets, or the plaster may contain barium sulfate. Operators view the target through a leaded glass screen, or if they must remain in the same room as the target, wear lead aprons.

=== Particle radiation ===
Particle radiation consists of a stream of charged or neutral particles, both charged ions and subatomic elementary particles. This includes solar wind, cosmic radiation, and neutron flux in nuclear reactors.

- Alpha particles (helium nuclei) are the least penetrating. Even very energetic alpha particles can be stopped by a single sheet of paper.
- Beta particles (electrons) are more penetrating, but still can be absorbed by a few millimetres of aluminium. However, in cases where high-energy beta particles are emitted, shielding must be accomplished with low atomic weight materials, e.g. plastic, wood, water, or acrylic glass (Plexiglas, Lucite). This is to reduce generation of Bremsstrahlung X-rays. In the case of beta+ radiation (positrons), the gamma radiation from the electron–positron annihilation reaction poses additional concern.
- Neutron radiation is not as readily absorbed as charged particle radiation, which makes this type highly penetrating. In a process called neutron activation, neutrons are absorbed by nuclei of atoms in a nuclear reaction. This most often creates a secondary radiation hazard, as the absorbing nuclei transmute to the next-heavier isotope, many of which are unstable.
- Cosmic radiation is not a common concern on Earth, as the Earth's atmosphere absorbs it and the magnetosphere acts as a shield, but it poses a significant problem for satellites and astronauts, especially while passing through the Van Allen Belt or while completely outside the protective regions of the Earth's magnetosphere. Frequent fliers may be at a slightly higher risk because of the decreased absorption from thinner atmosphere. Cosmic radiation is extremely high energy, and is very penetrating.

=== Electromagnetic radiation ===
Electromagnetic radiation consists of emissions of electromagnetic waves, the properties of which depend on the wavelength.

- X-ray and gamma radiation are best absorbed by atoms with heavy nuclei; the heavier the nucleus, the better the absorption. In some special applications, depleted uranium or thorium are used, but lead is much more common; several cm are often required. Barium sulfate is used in some applications too. However, when the cost is important, almost any material can be used, but it must be far thicker. Most nuclear reactors use thick concrete shields to create a bioshield with a thin water-cooled layer of lead on the inside to protect the porous concrete from the coolant inside. The concrete is also made with heavy aggregates, such as Baryte or Magnetite, to aid in the shielding properties of the concrete. Gamma rays are better absorbed by materials with high atomic numbers and high density, although neither effect is important compared to the total mass per area in the path of the gamma ray.
- Ultraviolet (UV) radiation is ionizing in its shortest wavelengths but is not penetrating, so it can be shielded by thin opaque layers such as sunscreen, clothing, and protective eyewear. Protection from UV is simpler than for the other forms of radiation above, so it is often considered separately.

In some cases, improper shielding can actually make the situation worse, when the radiation interacts with the shielding material and creates secondary radiation that absorbs in the organisms more readily. For example, although high atomic number materials are very effective in shielding photons, using them to shield beta particles may cause higher radiation exposure due to the production of Bremsstrahlung x-rays, and hence low atomic number materials are recommended. Also, using a material with a high neutron activation cross section to shield neutrons will result in the shielding material itself becoming radioactive and hence more dangerous than if it were not present.

== Personal protective equipment ==
Personal protective equipment (PPE) includes all clothing and accessories which can be worn to prevent severe illness and injury as a result of exposure to radioactive material. These include an SR100 (protection for 1hr), SR200 (protection for 2 hours). Because radiation can affect humans through internal and external contamination, various protection strategies have been developed to protect humans from the harmful effects of radiation exposure from a spectrum of sources. A few of these strategies developed to shield from internal, external, and high energy radiation are outlined below.

=== Internal contamination protective equipment ===
Internal contamination protection equipment protects against the inhalation and ingestion of radioactive material. Internal deposition of radioactive material result in direct exposure of radiation to organs and tissues inside the body. The respiratory protective equipment described below are designed to minimize the possibility of such material being inhaled or ingested as emergency workers are exposed to potentially radioactive environments.

Reusable air purifying respirators (APR)

- Elastic face piece worn over the mouth and nose
- Contains filters, cartridges, and canisters to provide increased protection and better filtration

Powered air-purifying respirator (PAPR)

- Battery powered blower forces contamination through air purifying filters
- Purified air delivered under positive pressure to face piece

Supplied-air respirator (SAR)

- Compressed air delivered from a stationary source to the face piece

Auxiliary escape respirator

- Protects wearer from breathing harmful gases, vapours, fumes, and dust
- Can be designed as an air-purifying escape respirator (APER) or a self-contained breathing apparatus (SCBA) type respirator
- SCBA type escape respirators have an attached source of breathing air and a hood that provides a barrier against contaminated outside air

Self-contained breathing apparatus (SCBA)

- Provides very pure, dry compressed air to full facepiece mask via a hose
- Air is exhaled to environment
- Worn when entering environments immediately dangerous to life and health (IDLH) or when information is inadequate to rule out IDLH atmosphere

=== External contamination protective equipment ===
External contamination protection equipment provides a barrier to shield radioactive material from being deposited externally on the body or clothes. The dermal protective equipment described below acts as a barrier to block radioactive material from physically touching the skin, but does not protect against externally penetrating high energy radiation.

Chemical-resistant inner suit

- Porous overall suit—Dermal protection from aerosols, dry particles, and non hazardous liquids.
- Non-porous overall suit to provide dermal protection from:
  - Dry powders and solids
  - Blood-borne pathogens and bio-hazards
  - Chemical splashes and inorganic acid/base aerosols
  - Mild liquid chemical splashes from toxics and corrosives
  - Toxic industrial chemicals and materials

Level C equivalent: Bunker gear

- Firefighter protective clothing
- Flame/water resistant
- Helmet, gloves, foot gear, and hood

Level B equivalent: Non-gas-tight encapsulating suit

- Designed for environments that are immediate health risks but contain no substances that can be absorbed by skin

Level A equivalent: Totally encapsulating chemical- and vapour-protective suit

- Designed for environments that are immediate health risks and contain substances that can be absorbed by skin

=== External penetrating radiation ===
There are many solutions to shielding against low-energy radiation exposure like low-energy X-rays. Lead shielding wear such as lead aprons can protect patients and clinicians from the potentially harmful radiation effects of day-to-day medical examinations. It is quite feasible to protect large surface areas of the body from radiation in the lower-energy spectrum because very little shielding material is required to provide the necessary protection.

Personal shielding against more energetic radiation such as gamma radiation is very difficult to achieve as the large mass of shielding material required to properly protect the entire body would make functional movement nearly impossible. For this, partial body shielding of radio-sensitive internal organs is the most viable protection strategy.

The immediate danger of intense exposure to high-energy gamma radiation is acute radiation syndrome (ARS), a result of irreversible bone marrow damage. The concept of selective shielding is based in the regenerative potential of the hematopoietic stem cells found in bone marrow. The regenerative quality of stem cells make it only necessary to protect enough bone marrow to repopulate the body with unaffected stem cells after the exposure: a similar concept which is applied in hematopoietic stem cell transplantation (HSCT), which is a common treatment for patients with leukemia. This scientific advancement allows for the development of a new class of relatively lightweight protective equipment that shields high concentrations of bone marrow to defer the hematopoietic sub-syndrome of acute radiation syndrome to much higher dosages.

One technique is to apply selective shielding to protect the high concentration of bone marrow stored in the hips and other radio-sensitive organs in the abdominal area. This allows first responders a safe way to perform necessary missions in radioactive environments.

== Radiation protection instruments ==
Practical radiation measurement using calibrated radiation protection instruments is essential in evaluating the effectiveness of protection measures, and in assessing the radiation dose likely to be received by individuals. The measuring instruments for radiation protection are both "installed" (in a fixed position) and portable (hand-held or transportable).

=== Installed instruments ===
Installed instruments are fixed in positions which are known to be important in assessing the general radiation hazard in an area. Examples are installed "area" radiation monitors, Gamma interlock monitors, personnel exit monitors, and airborne particulate monitors.

The area radiation monitor will measure the ambient radiation, usually X-Ray, Gamma or neutrons; these are radiations that can have significant radiation levels over a range in excess of tens of metres from their source, and thereby cover a wide area.

Gamma radiation "interlock monitors" are used in applications to prevent inadvertent exposure of workers to an excess dose by preventing personnel access to an area when a high radiation level is present. These interlock the process access directly.

Airborne contamination monitors measure the concentration of radioactive particles in the ambient air to guard against radioactive particles being ingested, or deposited in the lungs of personnel. These instruments will normally give a local alarm, but are often connected to an integrated safety system so that areas of plant can be evacuated and personnel are prevented from entering an air of high airborne contamination.

Personnel exit monitors (PEM) are used to monitor workers who are exiting a "contamination controlled" or potentially contaminated area. These can be in the form of hand monitors, clothing frisk probes, or whole body monitors. These monitor the surface of the workers body and clothing to check if any radioactive contamination has been deposited. These generally measure alpha or beta or gamma, or combinations of these.

The UK National Physical Laboratory publishes a good practice guide through its Ionising Radiation Metrology Forum concerning the provision of such equipment and the methodology of calculating the alarm levels to be used.

=== Portable instruments ===
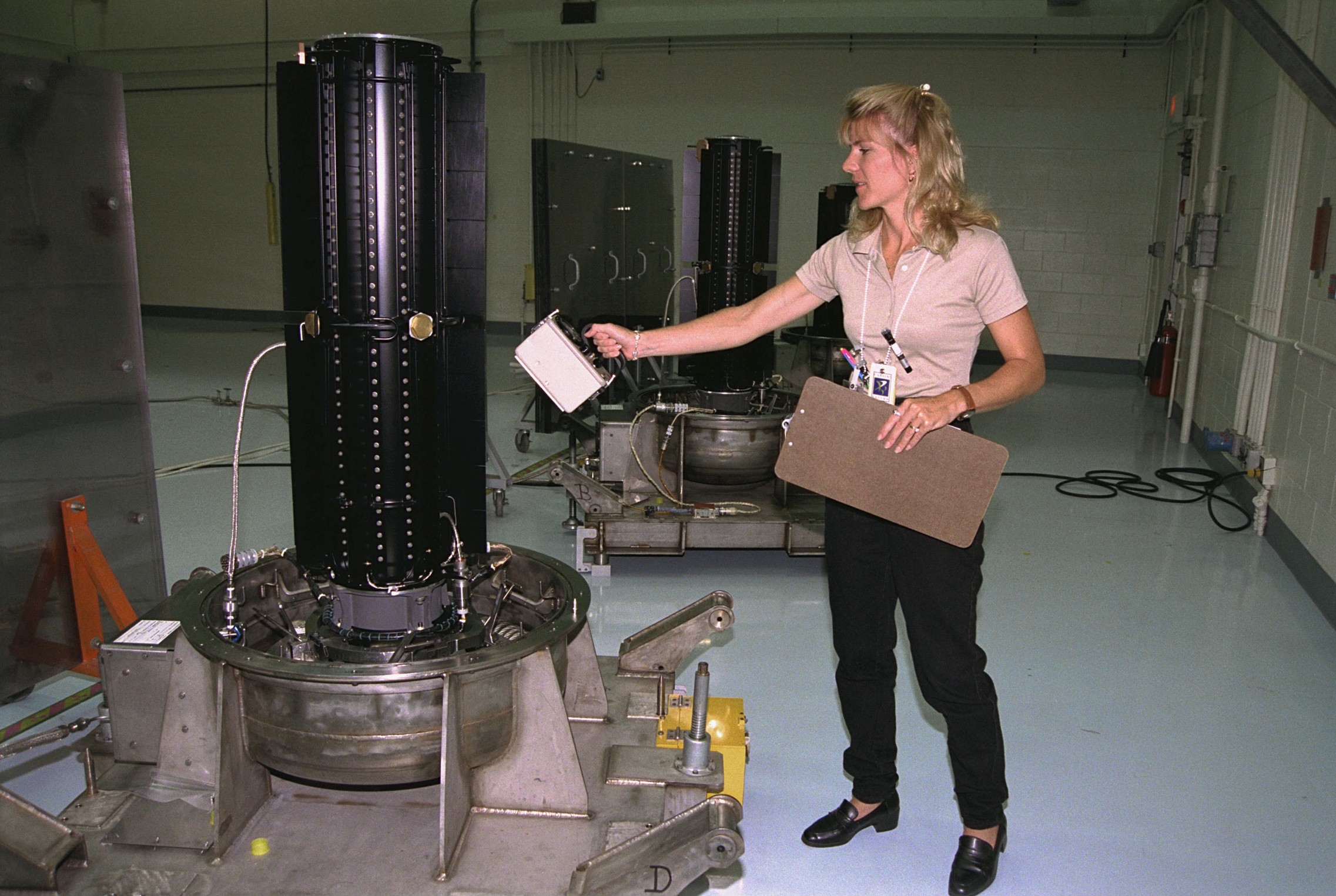
Hand-held ion chamber survey meter in use for surface dose rate on one of three radioisotope thermoelectric generators (RTGs) for the Cassini spacecraft.

Portable instruments are hand-held or transportable. The hand-held instrument is generally used as a survey meter to check an object or person in detail, or assess an area where no installed instrumentation exists. They can also be used for personnel exit monitoring or personnel contamination checks in the field. These generally measure alpha, beta or gamma, or combinations of these.

Transportable instruments are generally instruments that would have been permanently installed, but are temporarily placed in an area to provide continuous monitoring where it is likely there will be a hazard. Such instruments are often installed on trolleys to allow easy deployment, and are associated with temporary operational situations.

In the United Kingdom the HSE has issued a user guidance note on selecting the correct radiation measurement instrument for the application concerned. This covers all radiation instrument technologies, and is a useful comparative guide.

=== Instrument types ===
A number of commonly used detection instrument types are listed below, and are used for both fixed and survey monitoring.

- ionization chambers
- proportional counters
- Geiger counters
- semiconductor detectors
- scintillation detectors
- airborne particulate radioactivity monitoring

== Radiation related quantities ==
The following table shows the main radiation-related quantities and units.

Ionizing radiation related quantities
Quantity	Unit	Symbol	Derivation	Year	SI equivalent
Activity (A)	becquerel	Bq	s^{−1}	1974	SI unit
Activity (A)	curie	Ci	3.7×10^{10} s^{−1}	1953	3.7×10^{10} Bq
Activity (A)	rutherford	Rd	10^{6} s^{−1}	1946	1000000 Bq
Exposure (X)	coulomb per kilogram	C/kg	C⋅kg^{−1} of air	1974	SI unit
Exposure (X)	röntgen	R	esu / 0.001293 g of air	1928	2.58×10^{−4} C/kg
Absorbed dose (D)	gray	Gy	J⋅kg^{−1}	1974	SI unit
Absorbed dose (D)	erg per gram	erg/g	erg⋅g^{−1}	1950	1.0×10^{−4} Gy
Absorbed dose (D)	rad	rad	100 erg⋅g^{−1}	1953	0.010 Gy
Equivalent dose (H)	sievert	Sv	J⋅kg^{−1} × W_{R}	1977	SI unit
Equivalent dose (H)	röntgen equivalent man	rem	100 erg⋅g^{−1} × W_{R}	1971	0.010 Sv
Effective dose (E)	sievert	Sv	J⋅kg^{−1} × W_{R} × W_{T}	1977	SI unit
Effective dose (E)	röntgen equivalent man	rem	100 erg⋅g^{−1} × W_{R} × W_{T}	1971	0.010 Sv

Relation between some ionizing radiation units

== Radiological hazards in aeronautics and astronautics ==
Spacecraft, both robotic and crewed, must cope with the high radiation environment of outer space. Radiation emitted by the Sun and other galactic sources, and trapped in radiation "belts" is more dangerous and hundreds of times more intense than radiation sources such as medical X-rays or normal cosmic radiation usually experienced on Earth. When the intensely ionizing particles found in space strike human tissue, it can result in cell damage and may eventually lead to cancer.

The usual method for radiation protection is material shielding by spacecraft and equipment structures (usually aluminium), possibly augmented by polyethylene in human spaceflight where the main concern is high-energy protons and cosmic ray ions. On uncrewed spacecraft in high-electron-dose environments such as Jupiter missions, or medium Earth orbit (MEO), additional shielding with materials of a high atomic number can be effective. On long-duration crewed missions, advantage can be taken of the good shielding characteristics of liquid hydrogen fuel and water.

The NASA Space Radiation Laboratory makes use of a particle accelerator that produces beams of protons or heavy ions. These ions are typical of those accelerated in cosmic sources and by the Sun. The beams of ions move through a 100 m (328-foot) transport tunnel to the 37 m^{2} (400-square-foot) shielded target hall. There, they hit the target, which may be a biological sample or shielding material. In a 2002 NASA study, it was determined that materials that have high hydrogen contents, such as polyethylene or water, can reduce primary and secondary radiation to a greater extent than metals, such as aluminum. The problem with this "passive shielding" method is that radiation interactions in the material generate secondary radiation.

Active Shielding, that is, using magnets, high voltages, or artificial magnetospheres to slow down or deflect radiation, has been considered to potentially combat radiation in a feasible way. So far, the cost of equipment, power and weight of active shielding equipment outweigh their benefits. For example, active radiation equipment would need a habitable volume size to house it, and magnetic and electrostatic configurations often are not homogeneous in intensity, allowing high-energy particles to penetrate the magnetic and electric fields from low-intensity parts, like cusps in dipolar magnetic field of Earth. As of 2012, NASA is undergoing research in superconducting magnetic architecture for potential active shielding applications.

== Early radiation dangers ==
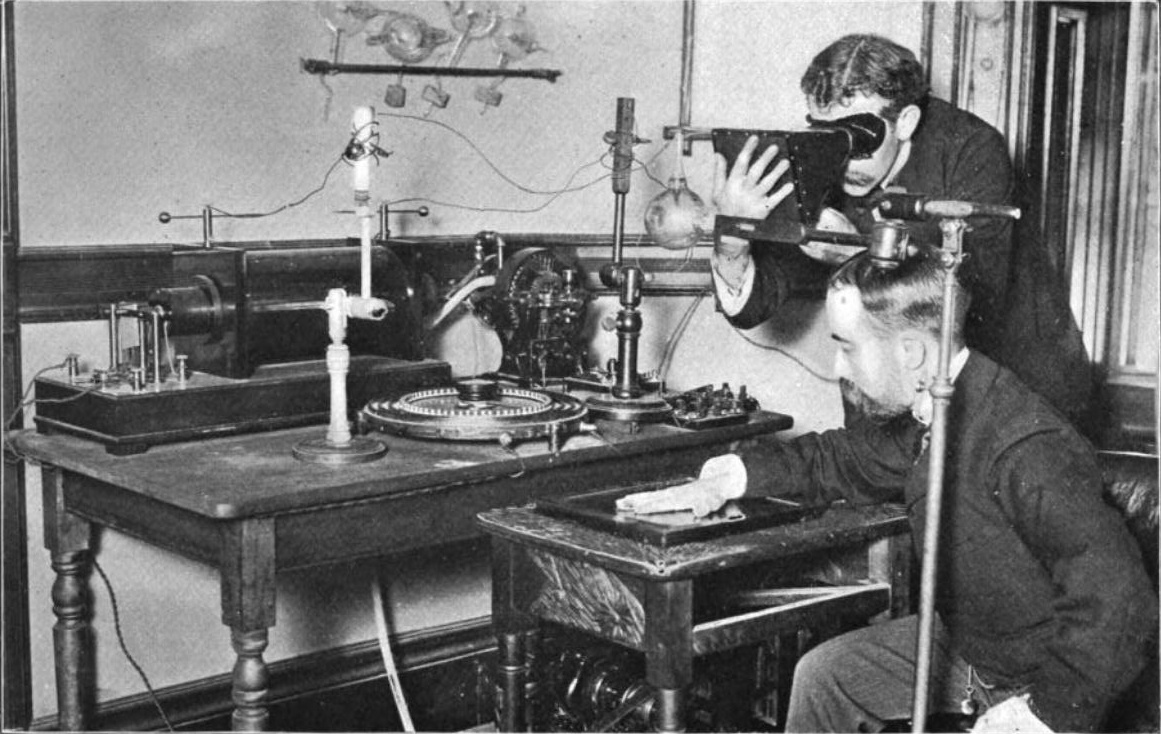
Using early Crookes tube X-Ray apparatus in 1896. One man is viewing his hand with a fluoroscope to optimise tube emissions, the other has his head close to the tube. No precautions are being taken.

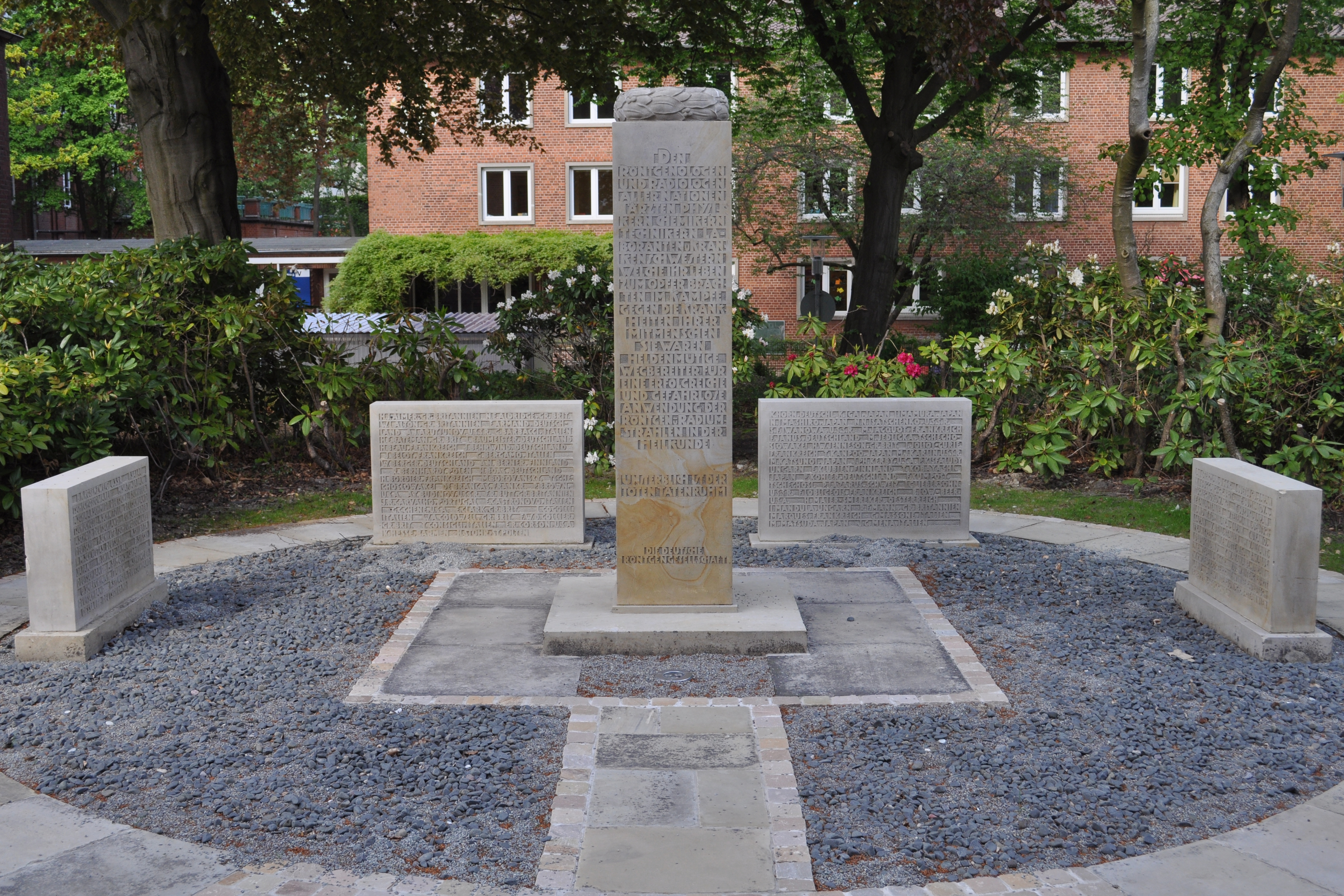
Monument to the X-ray and Radium Martyrs of All Nations erected 1936 at St. Georg hospital in Hamburg, commemorating 359 early radiology workers.

The dangers of radioactivity and radiation were not immediately recognized. The discovery of x‑rays in 1895 led to widespread experimentation by scientists, physicians, and inventors. Many people began recounting stories of burns, hair loss and worse in technical journals as early as 1896. In February of that year, Professors John Daniel and William Lofland Dudley of Vanderbilt University performed an experiment involving x-raying Dudley's head that resulted in his hair loss. A report by Dr. H.D. Hawks, a graduate of Columbia College, of his severe hand and chest burns in an x-ray demonstration, was the first of many other reports in Electrical Review.

Many experimenters including Elihu Thomson at Thomas Edison's lab, William J. Morton, and Nikola Tesla also reported burns. Elihu Thomson deliberately exposed a finger to an x-ray tube over a period of time and experienced pain, swelling, and blistering. Other effects, including ultraviolet rays and ozone were sometimes blamed for the damage. Many physicists claimed that there were no effects from x-ray exposure at all.

As early as 1902 William Herbert Rollins wrote almost despairingly that his warnings about the dangers involved in careless use of x-rays was not being heeded, either by industry or by his colleagues. By this time Rollins had proved that x-rays could kill experimental animals, could cause a pregnant guinea pig to abort, and that they could kill a fetus. He also stressed that "animals vary in susceptibility to the external action of X-light" and warned that these differences be considered when patients were treated by means of x-rays.

Before the biological effects of radiation were known, many physicists and corporations began marketing radioactive substances as patent medicine in the form of glow-in-the-dark pigments. Examples were radium enema treatments, and radium-containing waters to be drunk as tonics. Marie Curie protested against this sort of treatment, warning that the effects of radiation on the human body were not well understood. Curie later died from aplastic anaemia, most likely caused by exposure to ionizing radiation. By the 1930s, after a number of cases of bone necrosis and death of radium treatment enthusiasts, radium-containing medicinal products and other forms of radioactive quackery had been largely removed from the market.

== See also ==
- CBLB502, 'Protectan', a radioprotectant drug under development for its ability to protect cells during radiotherapy.
- Ex-Rad, a United States Department of Defense radioprotectant drug under development.
- Health physics
- Health threat from cosmic rays
- International Radiation Protection Association – (IRPA). The International body concerned with promoting the science and practice of radiation protection.
- Juno Radiation Vault
- Non-ionizing radiation
- Nuclear safety
- Potassium iodide
- Radiation monitoring
- Radiation Protection Convention, 1960
- Radiation protection reports of the European Union
- Radiobiology
- Radiological protection of patients
- Radioresistance
- Society for Radiological Protection – The principal UK body concerned with promoting the science and practice of radiation protection. It is the UK national affiliated body to IRPA
- United Nations Scientific Committee on the Effects of Atomic Radiation

== Notes ==
- Harvard University Radiation Protection Office Providing radiation guidance to Harvard University and affiliated institutions.
- Journal of Solid State Phenomena Tara Ahmadi, Use of Semi-Dipole Magnetic Field for Spacecraft Radiation Protection.
