= CPAM =

CPAM may refer to:

- Caisse primaire d'assurances maladie, a primary health insurance fund in France.
- Center for Performing Arts Medicine
- Center for Pure and Applied Mathematics
- Certified Patient Account Manager
- Certified Public Accountant in Malawi
- Christian Petersen Art Museum at Iowa State University
- College Park Aviation Museum
- Communications on Pure and Applied Mathematics
- Community Pesticide Action Monitoring
- Concrete Paving Association of Minnesota
- Concrete Pipe Association of Michigan
- Congenital pulmonary airway malformation
- Continental Polar Air Mass
- Continuous particulate air monitor
- Council of Presidential Awardees of Mathematics, an organization of recipients of the Presidential Award for Excellence in Mathematics and Science Teaching
- Crime Prevention Association of Michigan
- Cross-Platform Application Management

== See also ==
- CJWI on 1410 AM also known as CPAM Radio Union or CPAM 1410 - a French-language Canadian radio station located in Montreal, Quebec with mainly Haitian programming, but also the Latin American and French-speaking African communities
