= Radiation monitoring =

Measurement of radiation doses or contamination

Radiation monitoring involves the measurement of radiation dose or radionuclide contamination for reasons related to the assessment or control of exposure to radiation or radioactive substances, and the interpretation of the results.

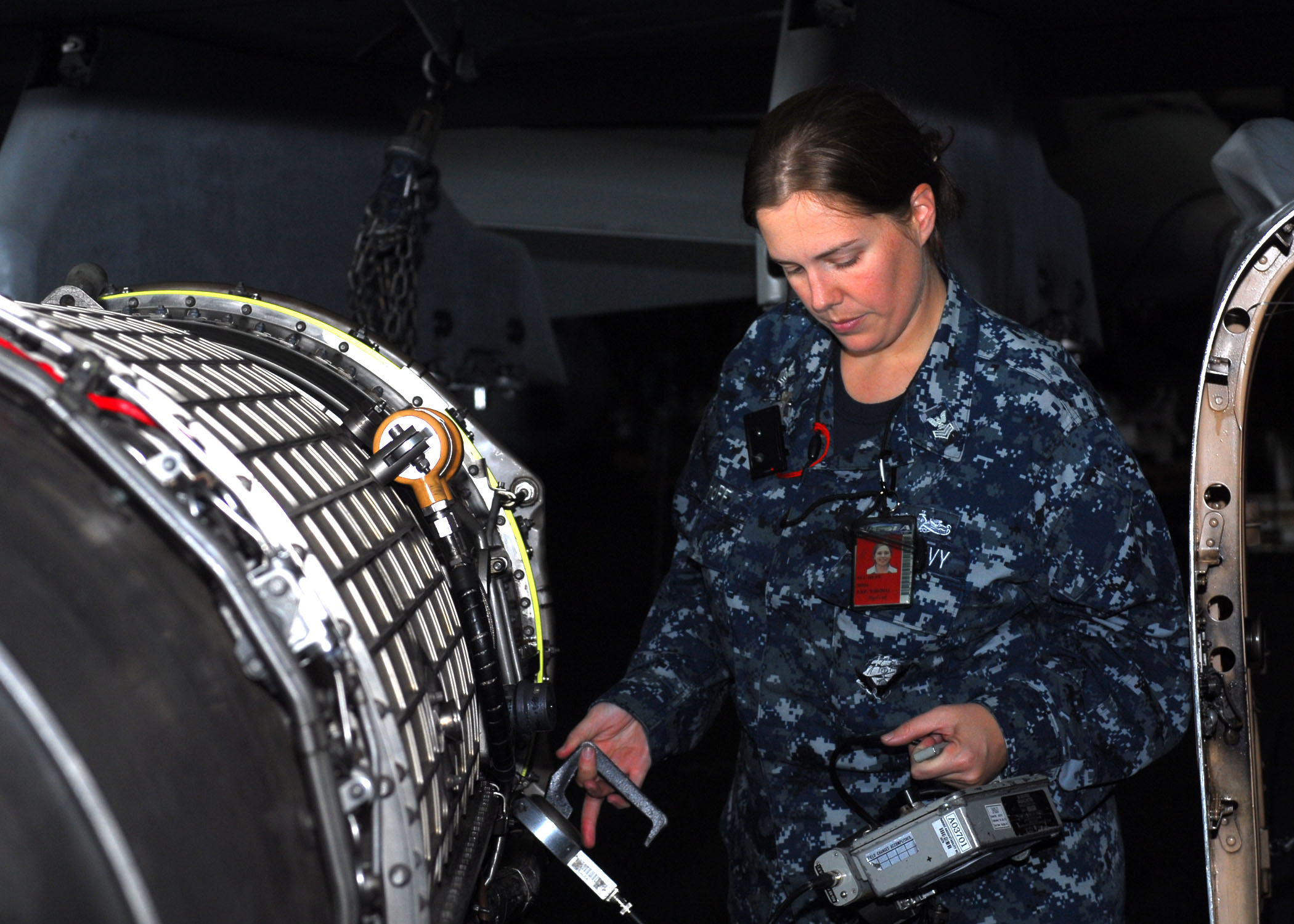
The U.S. Navy monitored radiation from the Fukushima I nuclear accidents

== Environmental monitoring ==
Environmental monitoring is the measurement of external dose rates due to sources in the environment or of radionuclide concentrations in environmental media.

== Source monitoring ==
Source monitoring is a specific term used in ionising radiation monitoring, and according to the IAEA, is the measurement of activity in radioactive material being released to the environment or of external dose rates due to sources within a facility or activity.

In this context a source is anything that may cause radiation exposure — such as by emitting ionising radiation, or releasing radioactive substances. The phrase "standard source" is also used as a de facto term in the more specific context of being a calibration standard source in ionising radiation metrology.

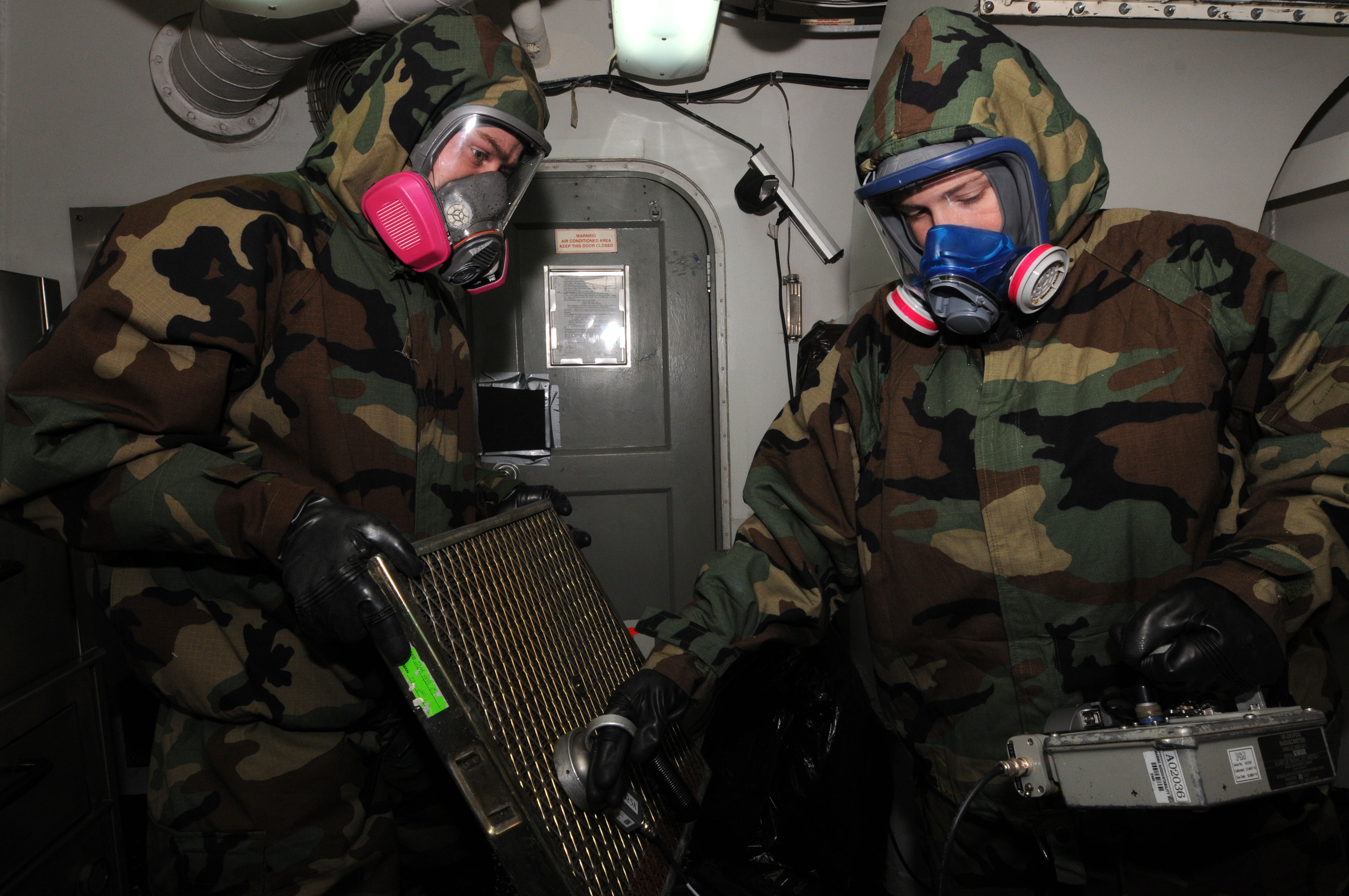
Personnel wearing full protective gear while checking air filters for radioactive contamination

The methodological and technical details of the design and operation of source and environmental radiation monitoring programmes and systems for different radionuclides, environmental media and types of facility are given in IAEA Safety Standards Series No. RS–G-1.8 and in IAEA Safety Reports Series No. 64.

== Radiation protection instruments ==
Practical radiation measurement using calibrated radiation protection instruments is essential in evaluating the effectiveness of protection measures, and in assessing the radiation dose likely to be received by individuals. The measuring instruments for radiation protection are both "installed" (in a fixed position) and portable (hand-held or transportable).

=== Installed instruments ===
Installed instruments are fixed in positions which are known to be important in assessing the general radiation hazard in an area. Examples are installed "area" radiation monitors, Gamma interlock monitors, personnel exit monitors, and airborne particulate monitors.

The area radiation monitor will measure the ambient radiation, usually X-ray, Gamma or neutrons; these are radiations which can have significant radiation levels over a range in excess of tens of metres from their source, and thereby cover a wide area.

Gamma radiation "interlock monitors" are used in applications to prevent inadvertent exposure of workers to an excess dose by preventing personnel access to an area when a high radiation level is present. These interlock the process access directly.

Airborne contamination monitors measure the concentration of radioactive particles in the ambient air to guard against radioactive particles being ingested, or deposited in the lungs of personnel. These instruments will normally give a local alarm, but are often connected to an integrated safety system so that areas of plant can be evacuated and personnel are prevented from entering an air of high airborne contamination.

"Personnel exit monitors" (PEM) are used to monitor workers who are exiting a "contamination controlled" or potentially contaminated area. These can be in the form of hand monitors, clothing frisk probes, or whole body monitors. These monitor the surface of the workers body and clothing to check if any radioactive contamination has been deposited. These generally measure alpha or beta or gamma, or combinations of these.

The UK National Physical Laboratory publishes a good practice guide through its Ionising Radiation Metrology Forum concerning the provision of such equipment and the methodology of calculating the alarm levels to be used.

=== Portable instruments ===
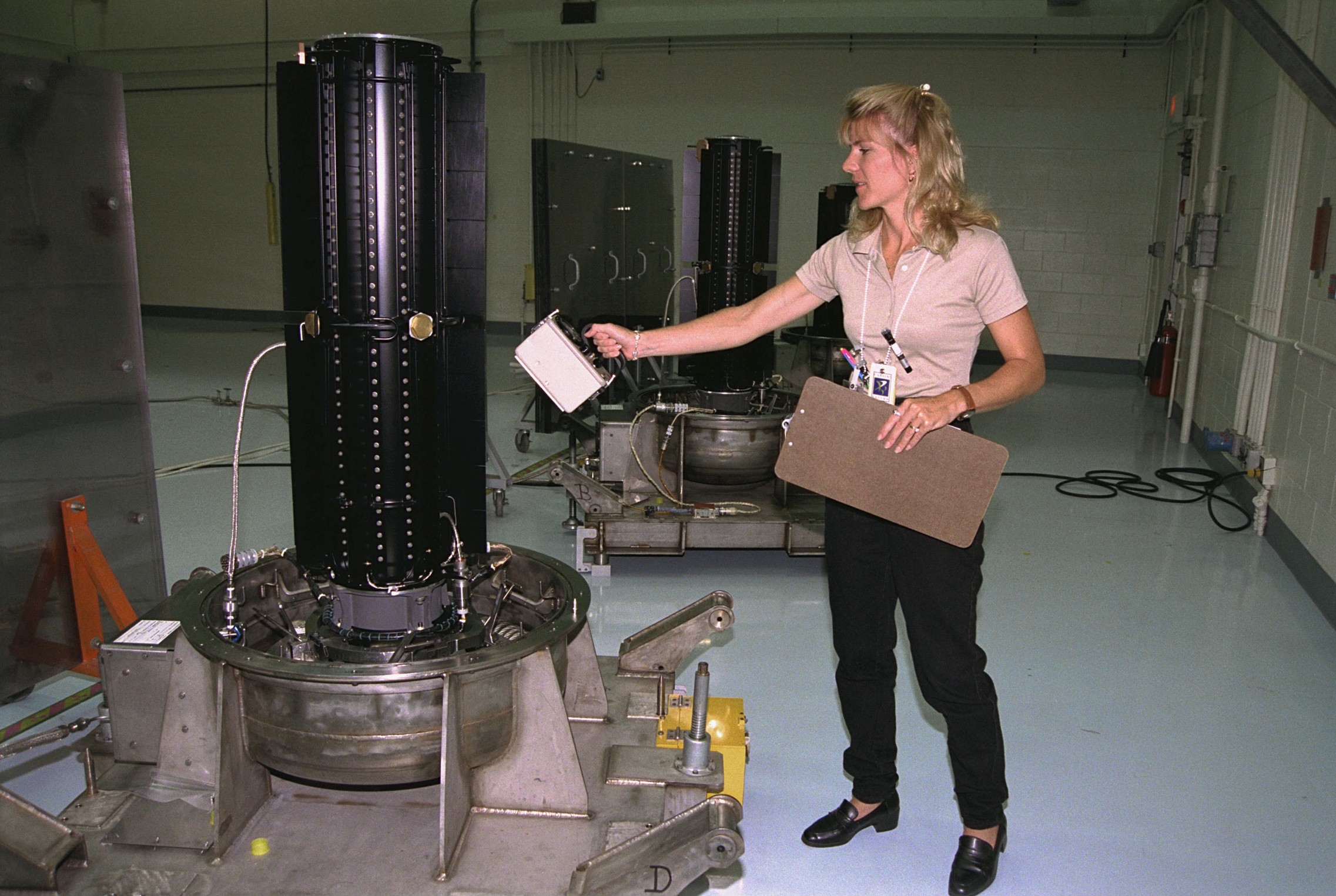
Hand-held ion chamber survey meter in use

Portable instruments are hand-held or transportable. The hand-held instrument is generally used as a survey meter to check an object or person in detail, or assess an area where no installed instrumentation exists. They can also be used for personnel exit monitoring or personnel contamination checks in the field. These generally measure alpha, beta or gamma, or combinations of these.

Transportable instruments are generally instruments that would have been permanently installed, but are temporarily placed in an area to provide continuous monitoring where it is likely there will be a hazard. Such instruments are often installed on trolleys to allow easy deployment, and are associated with temporary operational situations.

In the United Kingdom the HSE has issued a user guidance note on selecting the correct radiation measurement instrument for the application concerned. This covers all radiation instrument technologies, and is a useful comparative guide.

=== Instrument types ===
A number of commonly used detection instruments are listed below.

- ionization chambers
- proportional counters
- Geiger counters
- Semiconductor detectors
- Scintillation detectors
- Airborne particulate radioactivity monitoring

The links should be followed for a fuller description of each.

== See also ==
- Background Radiation § Radiation metrology for a list of environmental monitoring sites
- Dosimetry
- Minimum detectable activity
- Survey meter
