= Radiation Protection Convention, 1960 =

International Labour Organization Convention

C115
- ILO Convention
- Date of adoption: June 22, 1960
- Date in force: June 17, 1962
- Classification: Radiation, Toxic substances and Agents
- Subject: Occupational Safety and Health
- Previous: Fishermen's Articles of Agreement Convention, 1959
- Next: Final Articles Revision Convention, 1961

Radiation Protection Convention, 1960 is an International Labour Organization Convention to restrict workers from exposure to ionising radiation and to prohibit persons under 16 engaging in work that causes such exposure. (Article 6)

It was established in 1960, with the preamble stating:

Having decided upon the adoption of certain proposals with regard to the protection of workers against ionising radiations,...

Article 2. This Convention applies to all activities involving exposure of workers to ionising radiation in the course of their work.

Article 5. Every effort shall be made to restrict the exposure of workers to ionising radiation to the lowest protectable level.

Article 12 imposes undergoing further medical examinations at appropriate intervals, and Article 13 imposes the employer shall take any necessary remedial action on the basis of the technical findings and the medical advice.

== Ratifications ==
As of January 2023, the convention has been ratified by 50 countries.
