= William Herbert Rollins =

American scientist, inventor and dentist (1852–1929)

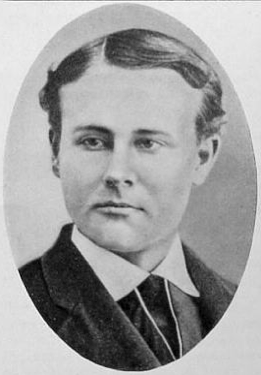
- Born: June 19, 1852; Charlestown, Massachusetts, United States
- Died: 1929 (aged 76-77)
- Occupations: Scientist, inventor, dentist

William Herbert Rollins (June 19, 1852 - 1929) was an American scientist, inventor, and dentist. He was a pioneer in radiation protection. Many of his inventions and investigations in medical radiography and photography have been ranked in importance with those of Thomas A. Edison, Elihu Thomson, and William J. Morton.

== Work ==
Rollins, a practicing dentist, had a medical degree from Harvard Medical School. He spent a great deal of his spare time, after the day's work, studying the recently discovered X-rays. Rollins referred to the penetrating rays as "X-light".

William studied dentistry as an apprentice to Dr. Kidder of Lawrence for three years. He then entered Harvard University School of Dentistry, graduating with the degree of D.M.D. in 1873, at the age of 21 years. A member of the faculty referred to Rollins as "one of the brightest men who has ever been graduated from the Dental School at Harvard."

In his workshop, Rollins developed a number of pioneering instruments for dentistry and improved on existing ones.

== Radiation protection ==
John Trowbridge, Professor of Physics at Harvard University, wrote, "No one appears to have had the experience of Dr. Rollins in exhausting X-ray tubes to the point of greatest efficiency". Rollins was one of the earliest pioneers to understand the possible dangers of X-rays.

Following a radiation-induced injury to his hand, Rollins developed new X-ray technology and techniques to reduce patient exposure to radiation. Such developments include the introduction of leaded X-ray tube casings, the use of collimators, and the invention of high-voltage tubes. In 1901, he suggested practitioners and patients wear leaded glasses and a radiopaque shield to cover the parts of the patient's body that were not being X-rayed.

In 1902 Rollins wrote, almost despairingly, that his warnings about the dangers involved in careless use of X-rays were not being heeded by industry or by his colleagues. By this time Rollins had proven that X-rays could kill animals, cause a pregnant guinea pig to abort, and kill a fetus. He also stressed that "animals vary in susceptibility to the external action of X-light" and warned that these differences should be considered when patients were treated by means of X-rays.

Rollins' findings eventually became standard practice, and he has been dubbed the "father of radiation protection". He was a member of the Radiological Society of North America, and its first treasurer.

== Publications and patents ==
William Rollins published no dental articles after 1903. However, the Index of Periodical Literature contains 79 references to his articles dating from 1874. These articles were published in 5 British and 24 American dental magazines, Of the latter, only one; Dental Digest, is still in existence.

Rollins decided not to patent any of his inventions and therefore was not spurred by ideas of monetary gain from his work. What Rollins did desire deeply, but did not receive, was a proper recognition of his work. It could have been, that his disregard for patents and his extreme humility resulted in a form of professional ostracism.

Although he published about three hundred papers on various medical and dental subjects, he never appeared at meetings and never personally presented a single paper to an audience. Furthering his extreme humility, Rollins would often not even sign his work, and would simply leave a simple drawing of two birds over a mountain.

Rollins was described by an historian of the American Academy of the History of Dentistry, Dr. A. Porter S. Sweet, as:

"Undoubtedly the greatest genius the dental professtion has ever known...He gave more to the dental, medical radiologic scientific world than any other practitioner of our profession. Yet no dentist has received so little recognition for his contributions."

== Personal life ==
William Rollins was born in Charlestown, Massachusetts, on June 19, 1852. He lived in Lawrence, Massachusetts for the greater part of his youth. He died in 1929.
