= Radiation protection of patients =

In medicine, patients are exposed to ionizing radiation when they undergo diagnostic examinations using x-rays or radiopharmaceuticals. Radiation is also used in therapy for cancer, and also in interventional procedures using fluoroscopy. Patients are protected from excess radiation in medicine primarily by the design safety measures, safety practices that reduce the risk of overdose, reducing routine dosages used, and reducing total number of investigations. Lead shielding is no longer recommended for dental X-rays or for gonadal shielding.

== History ==
In 2002 International Atomic Energy Agency (IAEA) established an action plan on the radiological protection of patients in recognition of the increasing importance of this topic. The emphasis in the past had been on radiation protection of staff and this has helped to reduce radiation doses to staff at levels well below the limits prescribed by the International Commission on Radiological Protection (ICRP) and accepted by most countries. The recent emphasis on radiation protection of patients is helping in developing strategies to reduce radiation doses to patients without compromising on diagnostic or therapeutic purpose.

In response to increased concern by the public over radiation doses and the ongoing progress of best practices, The Alliance for Radiation Safety in Pediatric Imaging was formed within the Society for Pediatric Radiology. In concert with the American Society of Radiologic Technologists, the American College of Radiology, and the American Association of Physicists in Medicine, the Society for Pediatric Radiology developed and launched the Image Gently campaign which is designed to maintain high quality imaging studies while using the lowest doses and best radiation safety practices available on pediatric patients in 2013. This initiative has been endorsed and applied by a growing list of various professional medical organizations around the world and has received support and assistance from companies that manufacture equipment used in radiology.

Following upon the success of the Image Gently campaign, the American College of Radiology, the Radiological Society of North America, the American Association of Physicists in Medicine, and the American Society of Radiologic Technologists have launched a similar campaign to address this issue in the adult population called Image Wisely. The World Health Organization and International Atomic Energy Agency (IAEA) of the United Nations have also been working in this area and have ongoing projects designed to broaden best practices and lower patient radiation dose.

== ALARA ==
"ALARA" ("As Low As Reasonably Achievable") should be maintained to reduce radiation doses to staff as well as patients.

== Lead shielding during routine X-rays and CT scans ==
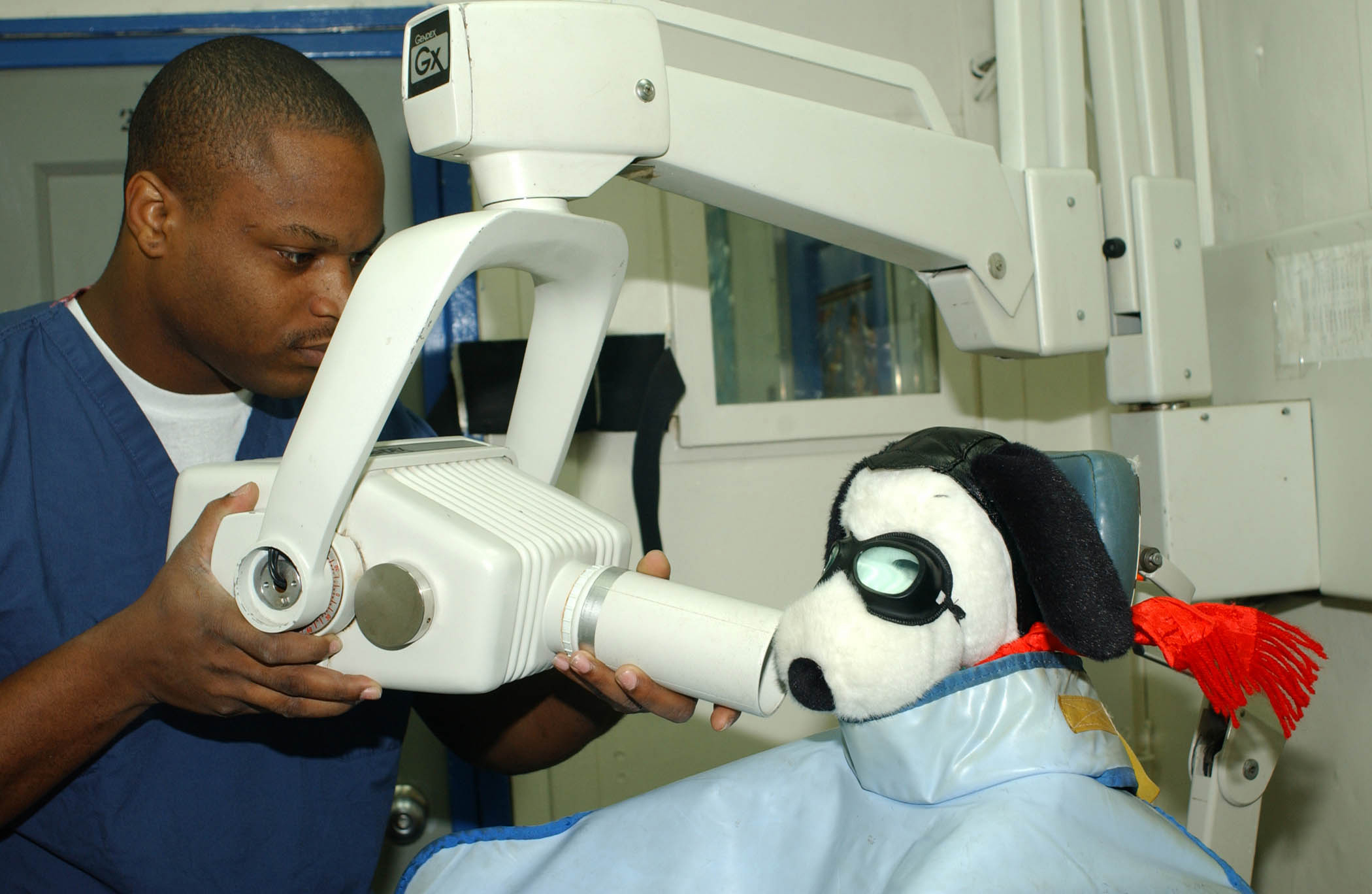
A mock dental X-ray being performed. The "patient" (a stuffed toy) is wearing a lead apron with collar to protect the thyroid and body from radiation exposure. Lead aprons are no longer recommended for dental X-rays.

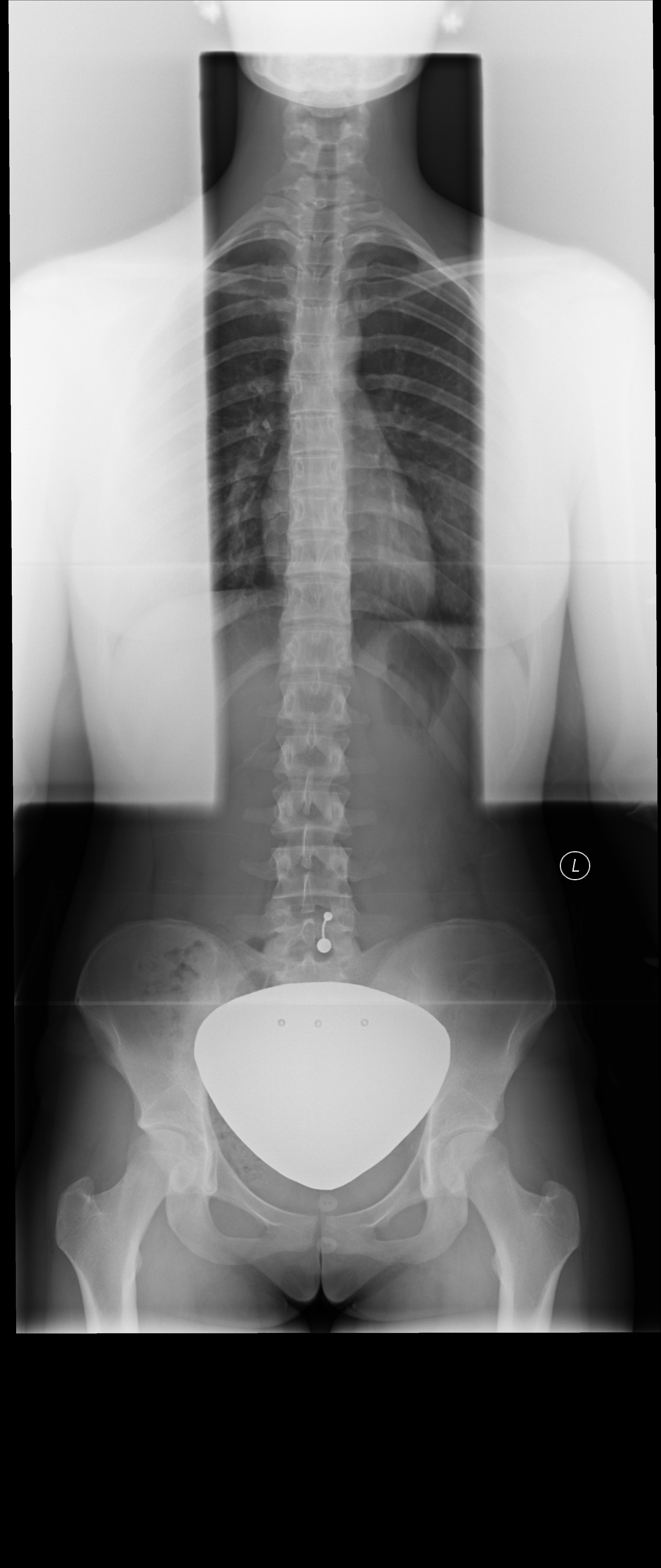
X-ray of the spine with a gonadal shield in place. Use of the gonadal shield is no longer recommended as it results in more radiation being used to produce the image, and does not protect against internal scatter.

Starting in the 1950s, lead shielding began to be used on patients during all X-rays over the abdomen to protect the gonads (reproductive organs) or a fetus if the patient was pregnant. Dental X-rays would also typically additionally use lead shielding to protect the thyroid. However, a consensus was reached between 2019 and 2021 that lead shielding for routine diagnostic X-rays is not necessary and may in some cases be harmful. In part, this is due to improved understanding of the effects of radiation on patients, as the amount of radiation patients were exposed to in routine X-rays and CT scans was found to be negligible enough to warrant functional harmlessness in fertility or a developing pregnancy. It was also due to the improvement of X-ray machines. For instance, older X-ray machines would use a set amount of radiation, and used film which requires more X-rays. Modern X-ray machines are digital, and automatically use the minimum amount of radiation needed to image the patient, which means overall the radiation levels are much lower than in the past; however, if the lead shield is in the field being imaged, the machine will produce more X-rays in order to attempt to penetrate the lead shield. Additionally, if the shield is in the field, this may affect the image produced, requiring a second X-ray to be performed, which would also lead to overall increased radiation exposure. Additionally, patient shielding is ineffective at reducing internal scatter; because only a portion of the patient is shielded, X-rays may still go through the gonads or fetus from bouncing off the imaged areas internally.

Lead shielding is still recommended for other people in the room, such as family members, health professionals, and X-ray technicians, as it reduces the amount of radiation received. Unlike with patients, there's no risk of increased radiation from using shielding since the use of shielding does not increase the amount of X-rays being produced by the machine as there is no potential for it to accidentally end up in the field. Additionally, health care professionals may be performing many X-rays a day, meaning they are exposed to more cumulative radiation, unlike patients who typically receive far fewer.

== See also ==
- Journal of Radiological Protection
- International Radiation Protection Association
- European Committee on Radiation Risk
