= Medical Examination (Fishermen) Convention, 1959 =

International Labour Organization Convention

C113
- ILO Convention
- Date of adoption: June 19, 1959
- Date in force: November 7, 1961
- Classification: Fishermen
- Subject: Fishermen
- Previous: Minimum Age (Fishermen) Convention, 1959
- Next: Fishermen's Articles of Agreement Convention, 1959

The Medical Examination (Fishermen) Convention, 1959 is an International Labour Organization Convention.

It was established in 1959, with the preamble stating "Having decided upon the adoption of certain proposals with regard to the medical examination of fishermen,..."

== Ratifications ==
As of 2022, the convention has been ratified by 30 states. Of these ratifying states, five—Bosnia and Herzegovina, France, Netherlands, Norway and Poland—had denounced the treaty via an automatic process that denounces the 1959 convention when a superseding convention is ratified by the same state.
