= Fishermen's Articles of Agreement Convention, 1959 =

International Labour Organization Convention

C114
- ILO Convention
- Date of adoption: June 19, 1959
- Date in force: November 7, 1961
- Classification: Fishermen
- Subject: Fishermen
- Previous: Medical Examination (Fishermen) Convention, 1959
- Next: Radiation Protection Convention, 1960

Fishermen's Articles of Agreement Convention, 1959 is an International Labour Organization Convention.

It was established in 1959, with the preamble stating:

Having decided upon the adoption of certain proposals with regard to fishermen's articles of agreement,...

== Ratifications ==
As of 2022, the convention had been ratified by 23 states. Four of the ratifying states—Bosnia and Herzegovina, France, Netherlands and United Kingdom—had denounced the convention automatically.
