= Survey meter =

Radiation measurement instrument

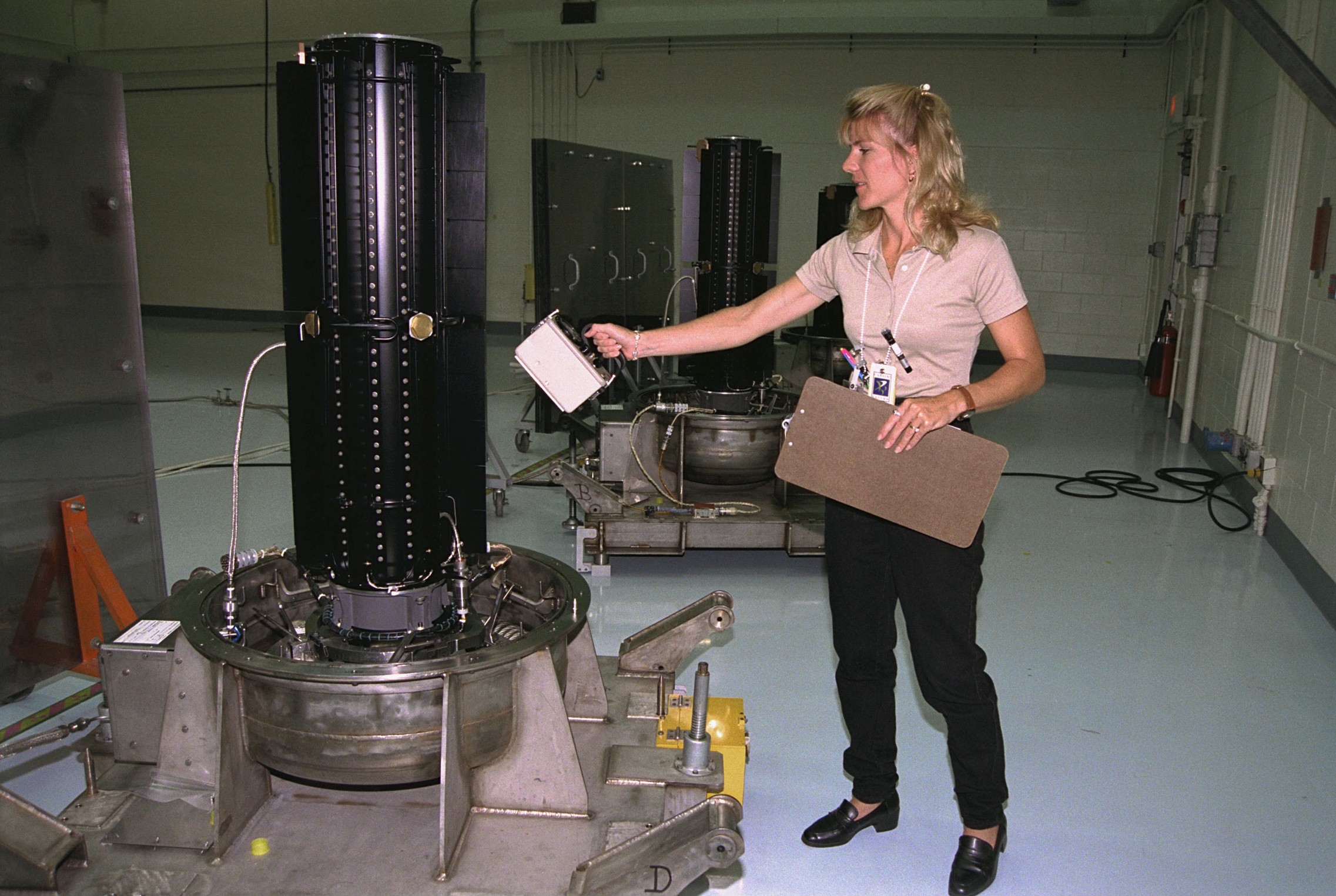
Hand-held ion chamber survey meter in use to detect gamma radiation

Survey meters in radiation protection are hand-held ionising radiation measurement instruments used to check such as personnel, equipment and the environment for radioactive contamination and ambient radiation. The hand-held survey meter is probably the most familiar radiation measuring device owing to its wide and visible use.

== Types ==
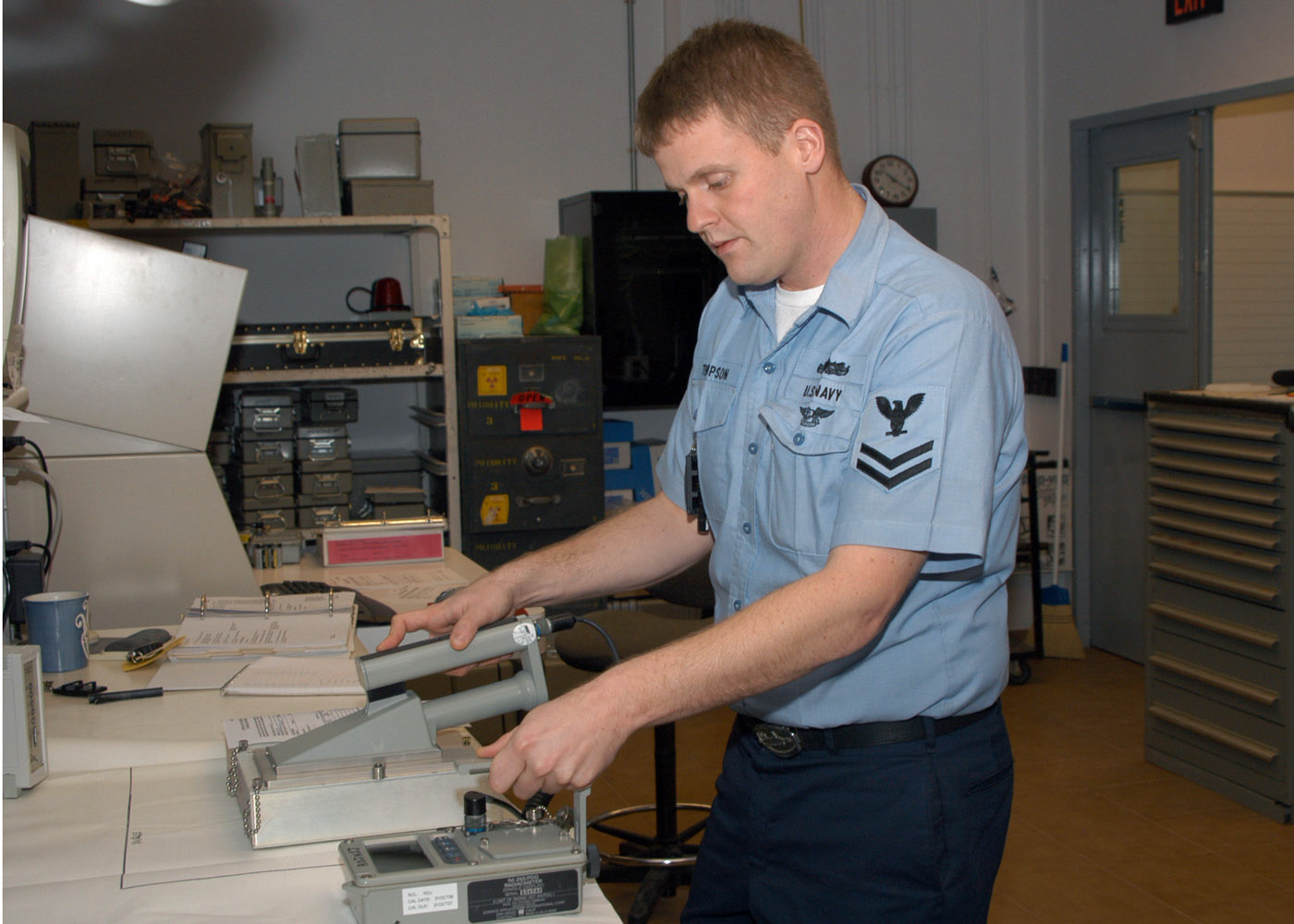
Alpha scintillation probe under calibration

The most commonly used hand-held survey meters are the scintillation counter, which is used in the measurement of alpha, beta and neutron particles; the Geiger counter, widely used for the measurement of alpha, beta and gamma levels; and the ion chamber, which is used for beta, gamma and X-ray measurements.

== Functional design ==
The instruments are designed to be hand-held, are battery powered and of low mass to allow easy manipulation. Other features include an easily readable display, in counts or radiation dose, and an audible indication of the count rate. This is usually the “click” associated with the Geiger type instrument, and can also be an alarm warning sound when a rate of radiation counts or dose has been exceeded. For dual channel detectors such as the scintillation detector it is normal to generate different sounds for alpha and beta. This gives the operator rapid feedback on both the level of radiation and the type of particle being detected. These features allow the user to concentrate on manipulation of the meter whilst having auditory feedback of the rate of radiation detected.

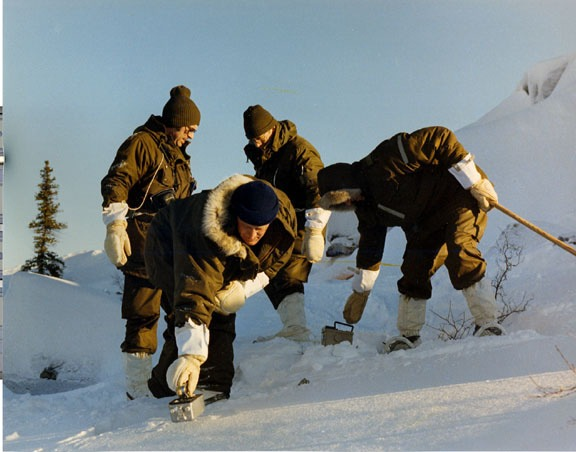
Survey meters in use in an extreme environment

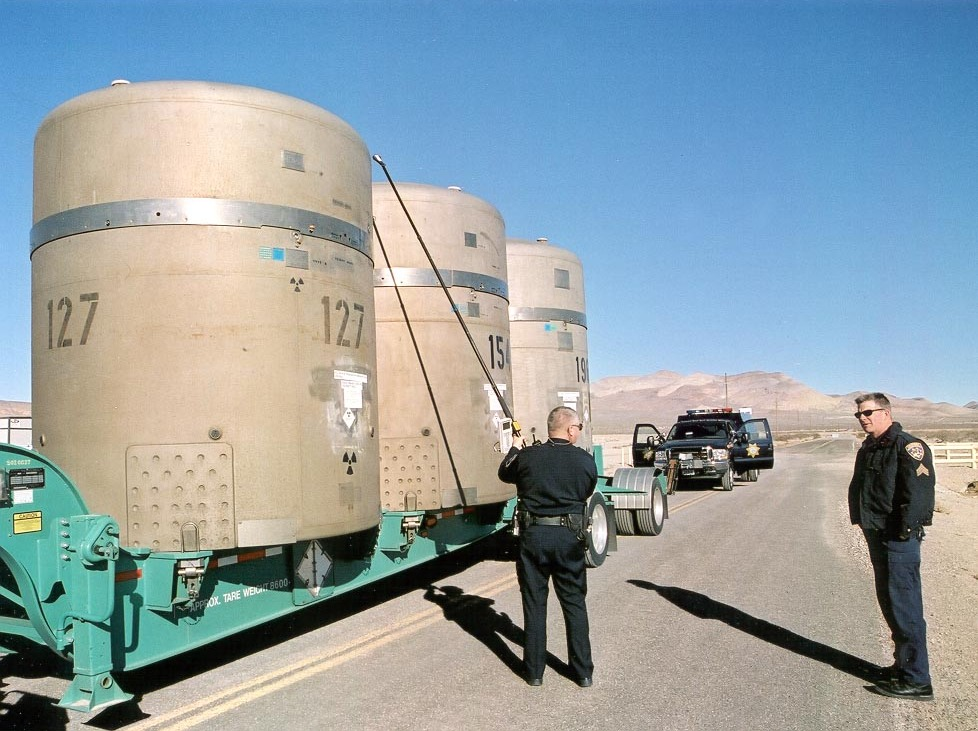
"hotspot" detector on long pole being used for detecting gamma

Meters can be fully integrated with probe and processing electronics in one housing to allow single-handed use, or have separate detector probe and electronics housings, joined by a signal cable. This latter is preferred for checking of convoluted surfaces for radioactive contamination due to the ease of manipulating the probe.

=== Readout ===
The readout for alpha and beta radiation is normally in counts, whilst that for gamma and X-ray is normally in a reading of radiation dose. The SI unit for this latter is the sievert. There is no simple universal conversion from count rate to dose rate, as it depends on the particle type, its energy, and the characteristic of the sensor. Count rate therefore tends to be used as a value which has been calculated for a particular application for use as a comparator or against an absolute alarm threshold. A dose instrument may be subsequently used if a dose reading is required. To help with this some instruments have both dose and count rate displays.

Battery operated meters usually have a battery level check.

== Ratemeters and scalers ==
Survey meters can be ratemeters or scalers

In Radiation Protection, an instrument which reads a rate of detected events is normally known as a ratemeter, which was first developed by N.S.Gingrich et al. in 1936. This provided a real-time dynamic indication of the radiation rate, and the principle has found widespread use in Health Physics and as radiation Survey meter.

An instrument which totalises the events detected over a time period is known as a scaler. This colloquial name stems from the early days of automatic counting, when a scaling circuit was required to divide down a high count rate to a speed which mechanical counters could register. This technique was developed by C E Wynn-Williams at The Cavendish Laboratory and first published in 1932. The original counters used the "Eccles-Jordan divider" circuit, today known as a flip flop. This was before the era of electronic indicators, which started with the introduction of the Dekatron tube in the 1950s.

== Measurement techniques and interpretation ==
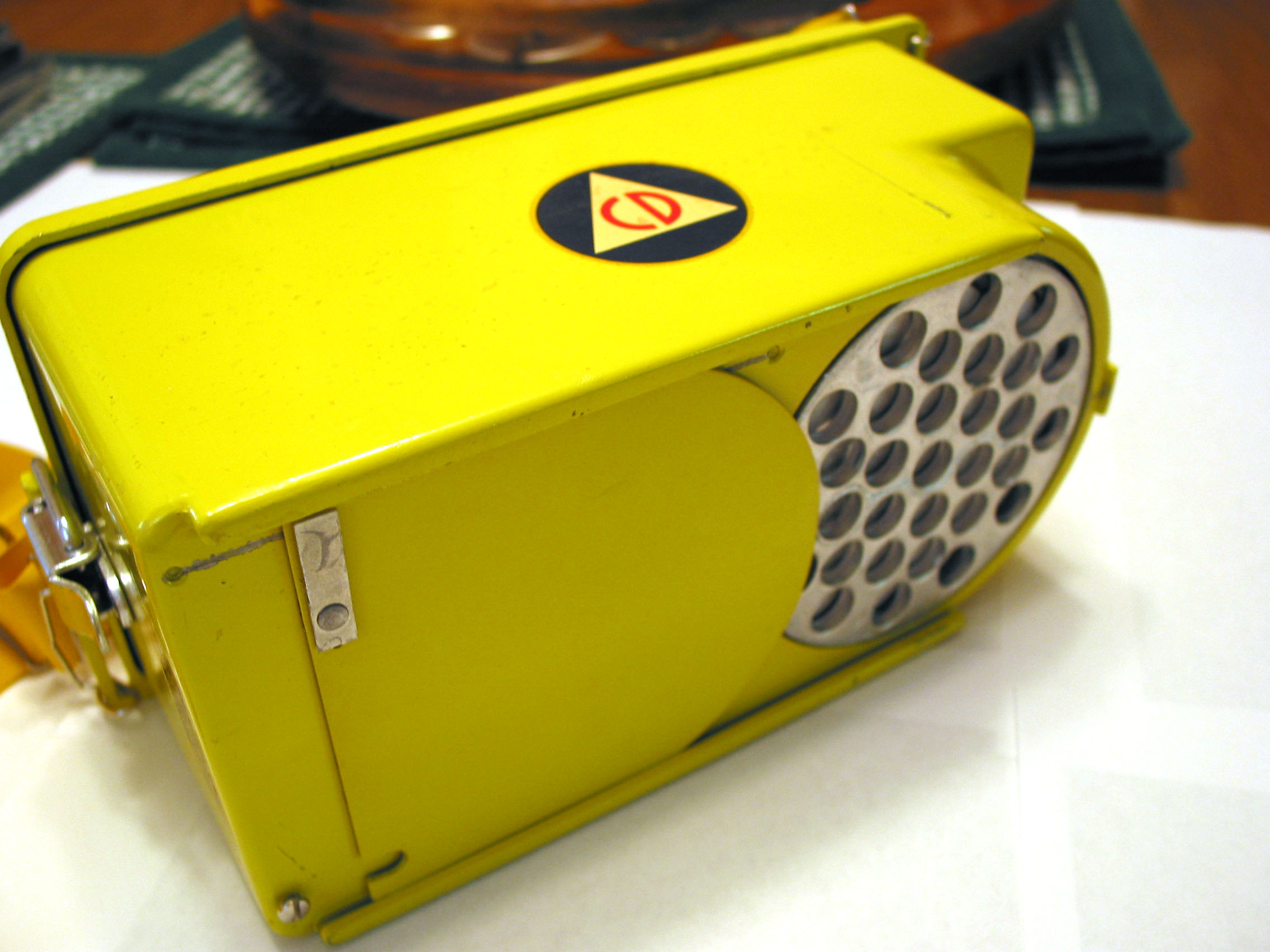
Ion chamber type survey meter showing beta radiation sliding absorption shield withdrawn to allow beta detection

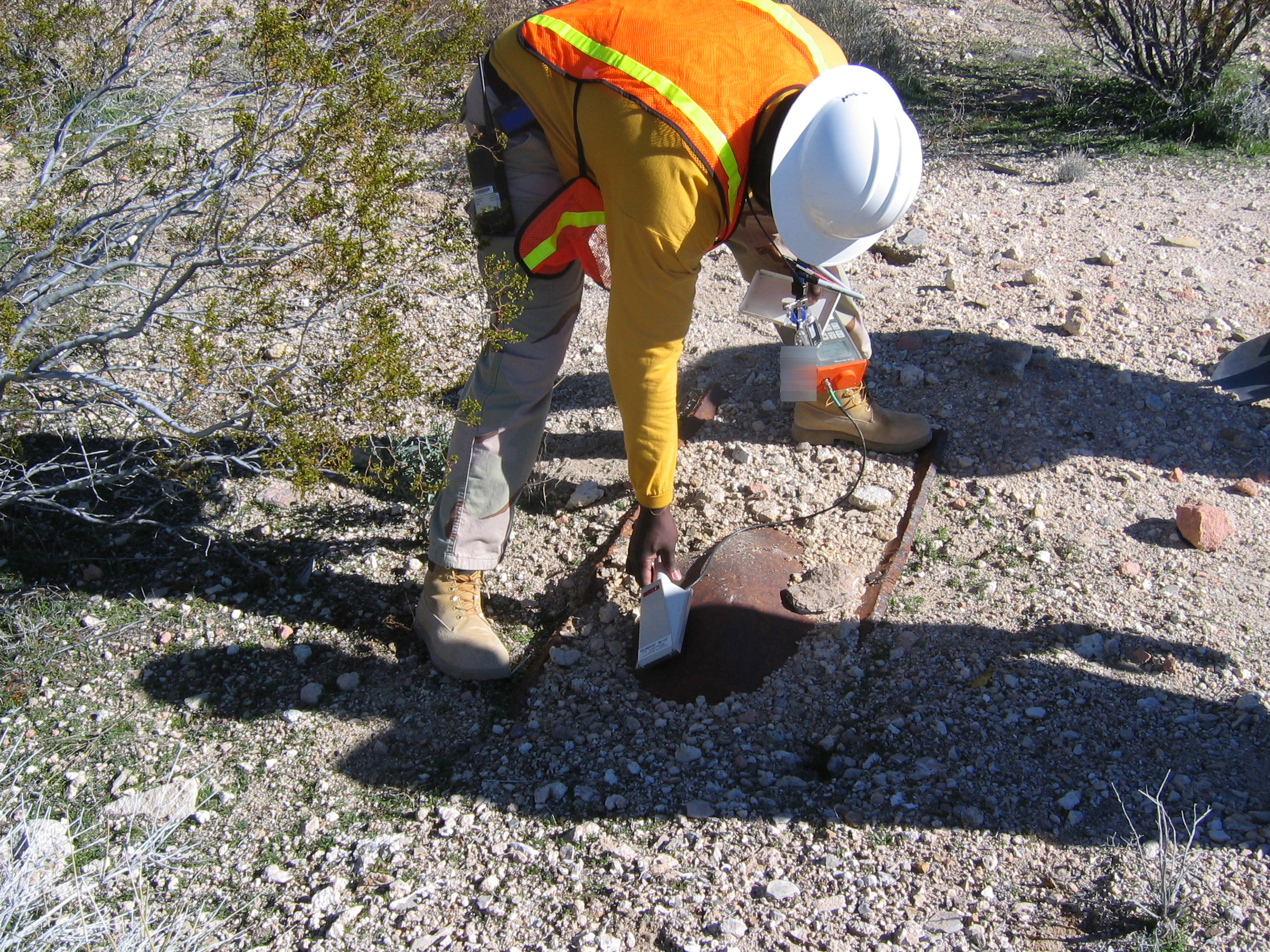
Large area scintillation probe being used to measure surface radioactive contamination. The probe is held as close to the surveyed object as practicable

The user must have an awareness of the types of radiation to be encountered so that the correct instrument is used. A further complication is the possible presence of "mixed radiation fields" where more than one form of radiation is present. Many instruments are sensitive to more than one type of radiation; alpha and beta, or beta and gamma, for instance, and the operator must know how to discriminate between these. The necessary skills in using a hand-held instrument are not only to manipulate the instrument, but also to interpret results of the rate of radiation exposure and the type of radiation being detected.

For instance, a Geiger end-window instrument cannot discriminate between alpha and beta, but moving the detector away from the source of radiation will reveal a drop off in alpha as the detector tube must normally be within 10mm of the alpha source to obtain a reasonable counting efficiency. The operator can now deduce that both alpha and beta is present. Likewise for a beta/gamma geiger instrument, the beta may have an effect at a range in the order of metres, depending on the energy of the beta, which may give rise to the false assumption that only gamma is being detected, but if a sliding shield type detector is used, the beta can be shielded out manually, leaving only the gamma reading.

For this reason, an instrument such as the dual phosphor scintillation probe, which will discriminate between alpha and beta, is used where routine checking will come across alpha and beta emitters simultaneously. This type of counter is known as "dual channel" and can discriminate between radiation types and give separate readouts for each.

However, scintillation probes can be affected by high gamma background levels, which must therefore be checked by the skilled operator to allow the instrument to compensate. A common technique is to remove the counter from any proximity to alpha and beta emitters and allow a "background" count of gamma. The instrument can then subtract this in subsequent readings.

In dose survey work Geiger counters are often just used to locate sources of radiation, and an ion chamber instrument is then used to obtain a more accurate measurement owing to their better accuracy and capability of counting higher dose rates.

In summary, there are a variety of instrument features and techniques to help the operator to work correctly, but the use by a skilled operator is necessary to ensure reliable results. The UK Health and Safety Executive has issued a guidance note on selecting the correct instrument for the application concerned, and the care and use of such instruments.
