= Airborne particulate radioactivity monitoring =

Use of particulate air monitors to assess radioactivity

Continuous particulate air monitors (CPAMs) have been used for years in nuclear facilities to assess airborne particulate radioactivity (APR). In more recent times they may also be used to monitor people in their homes for the presence of manmade radioactivity. These monitors can be used to trigger alarms, indicating to personnel that they should evacuate an area. This article will focus on CPAM use in nuclear power plants, as opposed to other nuclear fuel-cycle facilities, or laboratories, or public-safety applications.

In nuclear power plants, CPAMs are used for measuring releases of APR from the facility, monitoring levels of APR for protection of plant personnel, monitoring the air in the reactor containment structure to detect leakage from the reactor systems, and to control ventilation fans, when the APR level has exceeded a defined threshold in the ventilation system.

== Introduction ==
CPAMs use a pump to draw air through a filter medium to collect airborne particulate matter that carries very small particles of radioactive material; the air itself is not radioactive. The particulate radioactive material might be natural, e.g., radon decay products ("progeny", e.g., ^{212}Pb), or manmade, usually fission or activation products (e.g., ^{137}Cs), or a combination of both. There are also "gas monitors" which pass the air through a sample chamber volume which is viewed continuously by a radiation detector. Radionuclides that occur in the gaseous form (e.g., ^{85}Kr) are not collected on the CPAM filter to any appreciable extent, so that a separate monitoring system is needed to assess these nuclide concentrations in the sampled air. These gas monitors are often placed downstream of a CPAM so that any particulate matter in the sampled air is collected by the CPAM and thus will not contaminate the gas monitor's sample chamber.

=== Monitoring vs. sampling ===
In monitoring, the region of deposition of this material onto the filter medium is continuously viewed by a radiation detector, concurrent with the collection. This is as opposed to a sampling system, in which the airborne material is collected by pumping air, usually at a much higher volumetric flowrate than a CPAM, through a collection medium for some period of time, but there is no continuous radiation detection; the filter medium is removed periodically from the sampler and taken to a separate radiation detection system for analysis.

In general, sampling has better detection sensitivity for low levels of airborne radioactivity, due to the much larger total volume of air passing through the filter medium over the sampling interval (which may be on the order of hours), and also due to the more sophisticated forms of quantitative analysis available once the filter medium is removed from the sampler. On the other hand, monitoring with CPAMs provides nearly real-time airborne radioactivity level indication. It is common practice to refer to "sampled" air even when discussing a CPAM, i.e., as opposed to "monitored" air, which would, strictly, be more correct.

== CPAM types ==
There are two major types of CPAMs, fixed-filter and moving-filter. In the former, the filter medium does not move while the airborne material is collected. The latter type has two main variants, the rectangular deposition area (“window”) and the circular window. In both types of CPAM the sampled air is pulled (not pushed) by a pump through the piping of the monitor up to the structure that holds the filter medium. CPAM pumps are specially designed to maintain a constant volumetric flowrate.

As the air passes through the collection medium (usually a form of filter paper), particulate matter is deposited onto the filter in either a rectangular or circular pattern, depending on the instrument's design, and then the air continues on its way out of the monitor. The entire deposition area, regardless of its geometric shape, is assumed to be viewed by a radiation detector of a type appropriate for the nuclide in question.

Moving-filter monitors are often used in applications where loading of the filter medium with dust is an issue; this dust loading reduces the air flow over time. The moving-filter collection medium (“tape”) is assumed to move across the deposition area at a constant, known rate. This rate is often established in such a way that a roll of the filter tape will last about one month; a typical filter movement rate is about one inch per hour.

The rectangular-window moving filter monitor will be denoted as RW, and the circular, CW. Fixed filter is FF.

== CPAM applications ==
=== Effluent monitoring ===
CPAMs are used to monitor the air effluents from nuclear facilities, notably power reactors. Here the objective is to assess the amount of certain radionuclides released from the facility. Real-time measurement of the very low concentrations released by these facilities is difficult; a more-reliable measurement of the total radioactivity released over some time interval (days, perhaps weeks) may in some cases be an acceptable approach. In effluent monitoring, a sample of the air in the plant stack is withdrawn and pumped (pulled) down to the CPAM location. This sampled air in many cases must travel a considerable distance through piping. Extracting and transporting the particulates for the CPAM to measure in such a way that the measurement is representative of what is being released from the facility is challenging.

In the USA there are effluent monitoring requirements in both 10CFR20 and 10CFR50; Appendix B to the former and Appendix I to the latter are especially important. 10CFR50 Appendix A states:

Criterion 64--Monitoring radioactivity releases. Means shall be provided for monitoring the reactor containment atmosphere, spaces containing components for recirculation of loss-of-coolant accident fluids, effluent discharge paths, and the plant environs for radioactivity that may be released from normal operations, including anticipated operational occurrences, and from postulated accidents.

Also in the USA, Regulatory Guide 1.21, Measuring, Evaluating, and Reporting Radioactivity in Solid Wastes and Releases of Radioactive Materials in Liquid and Gaseous Effluents from Light-Water-Cooled Nuclear Power Plants is highly relevant to this CPAM application.

=== Occupational exposure assessment ===
For occupational exposure (inhalation) assessment, CPAMs may be used to monitor the air in some volume, such as a compartment in a nuclear facility where personnel are working. A difficulty with this is that, unless the air in the compartment is uniformly mixed, the measurement made at the monitor location may not be representative of the concentration of radioactive material in the air that the workers are breathing. For this application the CPAM may be physically placed directly in the occupied compartment, or it may extract sampled air from the HVAC system that serves that compartment. The following portions of 10CFR20 are relevant to the requirement for occupational exposure CPAM applications in the USA: 10CFR20.1003 (definition of Airborne Radioactivity Area), 1201, 1204, 1501, 1502, 2103.

=== Process monitoring and control ===
Radiation monitors in general have a number of process-control applications in nuclear power plants; a major CPAM application in this area is the monitoring of the air intake for the plant control room. In the event of an accident, high levels of airborne radioactivity could be brought into the control room by its HVAC system; the CPAM monitors this air and is intended to detect high concentrations of radioactivity and shut down the HVAC flow when necessary.

For use in the USA, standard 10CFR50 Appendix A states:

Criterion 19--Control room. A control room shall be provided from which actions can be taken to operate the nuclear power unit safely under normal conditions and to maintain it in a safe condition under accident conditions, including loss-of-coolant accidents. Adequate radiation protection shall be provided to permit access and occupancy of the control room under accident conditions without personnel receiving radiation exposures in excess of 5 rem whole body, or its equivalent to any part of the body, for the duration of the accident. Equipment at appropriate locations outside the control room shall be provided (1) with a design capability for prompt hot shutdown of the reactor, including necessary instrumentation and controls to maintain the unit in a safe condition during hot shutdown, and (2) with a potential capability for subsequent cold shutdown of the reactor through the use of suitable procedures.

This defines a requirement for monitoring the air intake for the control room, such that the exposure limits, including for inhalation exposure, shall not be exceeded. CPAMs are often used for this.

=== Reactor leak detection ===
Leakage from the so-called "reactor coolant pressure boundary" is required to be monitored in USA nuclear power plants. Monitoring the airborne particulate radioactivity in the reactor containment structure is an acceptable method to meet this requirement, and so CPAMs are used. It is the case that when primary coolant escapes into the containment structure, certain noble gas nuclides become airborne, and subsequently decay into particulate nuclides. One of the most common of these pairs is ^{88}Kr and ^{88}Rb; the latter is detected by the CPAM. Relating the observed CPAM response to the ^{88}Rb back to a leakage rate from the primary system is far from trivial.

The regulatory basis for this CPAM application is found in 10CFR50:

For use in the USA, standard 10 CFR 50, Appendix A, "General Design Criteria for Nuclear Power Plants," Criterion 30, "Quality of reactor coolant pressure boundary," requires that means be provided for detecting and, to the extent practical, identifying the location of the source of reactor coolant leakage. The specific attributes of the reactor coolant leakage detection systems are outlined in Regulatory Positions 1 through 9 of Regulatory Guide 1.45.

For use in the USA, standard 10 CFR 50.36, "Technical Specifications," paragraph (c)(2)(ii)(A), specifies that a Limiting Condition for Operation be established for installed instrumentation that is used to detect and indicate in the control room a significant abnormal degradation of the reactor coolant pressure boundary. This instrumentation is required by Specification 3.4.15, "RCS Leakage Detection Instrumentation."

Step changes in reactor coolant leakage can be detected with moving filter media to satisfy the quantitative requirements of USNRC Regulatory Guide 1.45. [See description for US Patent Number 5343046 (1994).] The mathematical method is highly detailed and it focuses on time-dependent viewable collected activity, rather than concentration, as f(t). The method, among other features, yields the desired fixed-filter degenerate case (filter paper velocity = 0.) The method was first put into use in the 1990s at a nuclear power plant in the United States. Though originally derived for dominant Kr-88/Rb-88 in leaked reactor coolant, it has been expanded to include Xe-138/Cs-138 and can be modified by replication to include any N similar pairings. Further refinements to mathematical methodologies have been made by the inventor; these set aside the patented collimator apparatus for making the quantitative assessment of leak rate step change when rectangular OR circular collection grids are employed. The new methods are the simplest obtainable and are appropriate for any array of input concentrations. 30-second YouTube video examples: search ‘airborne particulate radioactivity moving filter.’

=== Some CPAM application considerations ===
==== Importance of nuclide half-life ====
The response of the monitor is sensitive to the half-life of the nuclide being collected and measured. It is useful to define a "long-lived" (LL) nuclide to have negligible decay during the measurement interval. On the other hand, if the decay cannot be ignored, the nuclide is considered "short-lived" (SL). In general, for the monitor response models discussed below, the LL response can be obtained from the SL response by taking limits of the SL equation as the decay constant approaches zero. If there is any question about which response model to use, the SL expressions will always apply; however, the LL equations are considerably simpler and so should be used when there is no question about the half-life (e.g., ^{137}Cs is LL).

==== Ratemeter ====
The output of the radiation detector is a random sequence of pulses, usually processed by some form of "ratemeter," which continuously estimates the rate at which the detector is responding to the radioactivity deposited on the filter medium. There are two fundamental types of ratemeters, analog and digital. The ratemeter output is called the countrate, and it varies with time.

Ratemeters of both types have the additional function of "smoothing" the output countrate estimate, i.e., reducing its variability. (This process is more correctly termed "filtering.") Ratemeters must make a tradeoff between this necessary variance reduction and their response time; a smooth output (small variance) will tend to lag behind an increase in the true pulse rate. The significance of this lag depends on the application of the monitor.

==== Ambient background ====
Even when the filter medium is clean, that is, before the pump is started that pulls the air through the filter, the detector will respond to the ambient "background" radiation in the vicinity of the monitor. The countrate that results from deposited radioactivity is called the "net" countrate, and is obtained by subtracting this background countrate from the dynamically-varying countrate that is observed once the pump is started. The background is usually assumed to be constant.

==== Integration time ====
The countrate of the monitor varies dynamically, so that a measurement time interval must be specified. Also, these are integrating devices, meaning that some finite time is required to accumulate radioactivity onto the filter medium. The input to the monitor is, in general, a time-dependent concentration in air of the specified nuclide. However, for the calculations given below, this concentration will be held constant over that interval.

==== Constant-concentration time limitation ====
Since concentrations resulting from physical events tend to vary with time, due to dilution processes and/or a nonconstant source term (airborne radioactivity emission rate), it is not realistic to hold the concentration constant for significant lengths of time. Thus, measurement intervals on the order of several hours are not plausible for the purposes of these calculations.

==== Parent-progeny; RnTn ====
There are situations in which a nuclide deposited on the CPAM filter decays into another nuclide, and that second nuclide remains on the filter. This "parent-progeny" or decay chain situation is especially relevant to so-called "radon-thoron" (RnTn) or natural airborne radioactivity. The mathematical treatment described in this article does not consider this situation, but it can be treated using matrix methods (see Ref [11]).

==== Multiple nuclides; superposition ====
Another issue is the fact that in a power reactor context it would be unusual for a CPAM to be collecting only a single particulate nuclide; more likely there would be a mixture of fission product and activation product nuclides. The modeling discussed in this article considers only one nuclide at a time. However, since the radiation emitted by each nuclide is independent of the others, so that the nuclides present on the filter medium do not interact with each other, the monitor response is the linear combination of the individual responses. Thus the overall CPAM response to a mixture is just the superposition (i.e., the sum) of the individual responses.

==== Detector type ====
CPAMs use either a Geiger tube, for "gross beta-gamma" counting, or a NaI(Tl) crystal, often for simple single-channel gamma spectroscopy. (In this context, "gross" means a measurement that does not attempt to find the specific nuclides in the sample.) Plastic scintillators are also popular. Essentially, in power reactor applications, beta and gamma are the radiations of interest for particulate monitoring.

In other fuel-cycle applications, such as nuclear reprocessing, alpha detection is of interest. In those cases, the interference from other isotopes such as RnTn is a major problem, and more sophisticated analysis, such as the use of HPGe detectors and multichannel analyzers, are used where spectral information, such as is used for Radon compensation, is required.

Radioiodine (especially ^{131}I) monitoring is often done using a particulate-monitor setup, but with an activated charcoal collection medium, which can adsorb some iodine vapors as well as particulate forms. Single-channel spectroscopy is usually specified for iodine monitors.

== Dynamic response of CPAMs ==
Detailed mathematical models that describe the dynamic, time-dependent countrate response of these monitors in a very general manner are presented in and will not be repeated here. For the purpose of this article, a few useful results from that paper will be summarized. The objective is to predict the net countrate of a CPAM for a single, specific manmade nuclide, for a given set of conditions. That predicted response can be compared to the expected background and/or interferences (nuclides other than the one sought), to assess the monitor’s detection capability. The response predictions can also be used to calculate alarm setpoints that correspond to appropriate limits (such as those in 10CFR20) on the concentration of airborne radioactivity in the sampled air.

=== Model parameters ===
The parameters used in these models are summarized in this list:

- Time interval (t); time; measured from start of concentration step
- Concentration (Q_{0}); activity / volume; assumed constant over the interval
- Decay constant (λ); 1 / time; for the specified nuclide
- Media collection/retention efficiency (φ); implicitly includes line loss
- Window length or radius (L or R); length; consistent units with v
- Filter speed (v); length / time; length has same units as L or R
- Flow rate (F_{m}); volume / time; assumed constant over the interval
- Detection efficiency (ε); counts / disintegration; implicitly includes emission abundance

"Line loss" refers to the losses of particulate matter in transit from a sampling point to the monitor; thus the concentration measured would be somewhat lower than that in the original sampled air. This factor is meant to compensate for these losses. Sampling lines are specifically designed to minimize these losses, for example, by making bends gradual as opposed to right-angled. These lines (pipes) are needed since in many applications the CPAM cannot be physically located directly in the sampled air volume, such as a nuclear power plant's main stack, or the ventilation air intake for the plant control room.

"Emission abundance" refers to the fact that the disintegration of any given nucleus of the isotope of interest in the CPAM analysis may not result in the emission of the radiation being detected (e.g., a beta particle or gamma ray). Thus, overall there will be some fraction of the disintegrations that emit the radiation of interest (e.g. the 662 keV gamma ray of ^{137}Cs is emitted in about 85% of the disintegrations of ^{137}Cs nuclei).

=== Fixed-filter model ===
The response models are based on the consideration of the sources and losses of the deposited radioactivity on the filter medium. Taking the simplest case, the FF monitor, this leads to a differential equation which expresses the rate of change of the monitor countrate:

$${{d\dot C_{FF} } \over {dt}}\,\,\, = \,\,\,\varepsilon \,k\,F_m \,\phi \,Q(t)\,\, - \,\,\lambda \,\dot C_{FF}$$

The first term accounts for the source of radioactivity from the sampled air, and the second term is the loss due to the decay of that radioactivity. A convenient way to express the solution to this equation uses the scalar convolution integral, which results in

$$\dot C_{FF} (t)\,\, = \,\,\varepsilon \,k\,F_m \,\phi \,\,\exp \left( { - \lambda \,t} \right)\,\,\int_0^t {Q(\tau )\,\,\exp (\lambda \tau )\,d\tau \,\,\, + \,\,\,\dot C_0 \exp \left( { - \lambda \,t} \right)}$$

The last term accounts for any initial activity on the filter medium, and is usually set to zero (clean filter at time zero). The initial countrate of the monitor, before the concentration transient begins, is only that due to ambient background. If radon progeny are present, they are assumed to be at equilibrium and generating a constant countrate that adds to the ambient background’s countrate.

Various solutions for the time-dependent FF countrate follow directly, once a concentration time-dependence Q(t) has been specified. Note that the monitor flowrate F_{m} is assumed constant; if it isn't, and its time-dependence is known, then that F_{m}(t) would need to be placed inside the integral. Also note that the time variable in all the models is measured from the instant the concentration in the sampled air begins to increase.

=== Moving-filter models ===
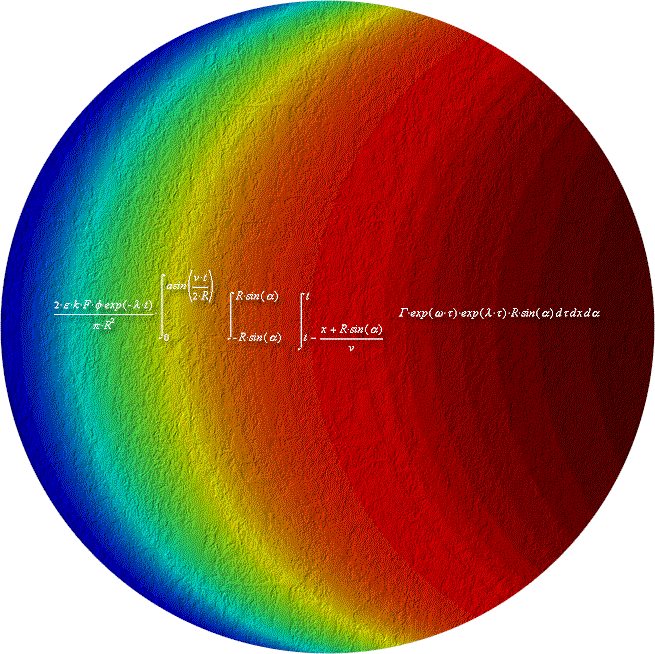
Circular-window moving filter monitor; deposited radioactivity isoactivity contours, after transit time, constant input concentration.

For the moving-filter CPAMs, the above expression is a starting point, but the models are considerably more complicated, due to (1) the loss of material as the filter medium moves away from the detector's field of view and (2) the differing lengths of time that parts of the filter medium have been exposed to the sampled air. The basic modeling approach is to break down the deposition regions into small differential areas and then consider how long each such area receives radioactive material from the air.

The resulting expressions are integrated across the deposition region to find the overall response. The RW solution consists of two double integrals, while the CW response solution consists of three triple integrals. A very important consideration in these models is the "transit time," which is the time required for a differential area to traverse the window along its longest dimension. As a practical matter, the transit time is the time required for all differential elements that were in the deposition window at time zero to leave the window.

This figure shows contours of constant activity on a CW deposition area, after the transit time has expired. The filter moves from left to right, and the activity increases from left to right. The differential areas on the diameter have been in the deposition window the longest, and at the far right, have been in the window, accumulating activity, for the full transit time.

Finally, to illustrate the complexity of these models, the RW response for time less than the transit time is

$$\dot C_{RW} (t)\,\,\, = \,\,\,{{\varepsilon \,k\,F_m \,\phi \,\,\exp \left( { - \lambda \,t} \right)} \over L}\left[ {\int_0^{v\,t} {\int_{t\, - \,\left( {{x \over v}} \right)}^t {Q(\tau )\exp (\lambda \,\tau )\,d\tau \,dx\,\,\, + \,\,\,\int_{v\,t}^L {\int_0^t {Q(\tau )\exp (\lambda \,\tau )\,d\tau \,dx} } } } } \right]$$

and, also, one of the CW triple integrals is superimposed on the contour plot.

== Selected CPAM response models: constant concentration ==
In these equations, k is a conversion constant for units reconciliation. Again, a very important parameter for moving-filter monitors is the “transit time” (T), which is the window length (or diameter) divided by the filter tape speed v. The countrate is denoted by $\dot C$.

=== Fixed-filter (FF), any half-life ===
$$\dot C_{FF} (t) = \varepsilon \,k\,F_m \,\phi \,Q_0 {{1\,\,\, - \,\,\exp ( - \lambda \,t)} \over \lambda }$$

=== Fixed-filter (FF), long-lived (LL) ===
$$\dot C_{FF} (t) = \varepsilon \,k\,F_m \,\phi \,Q_0 \,t$$

=== Rectangular window (RW), time less than transit time T, any half-life ===
$$\dot C_{RW} (t)\,\,\, = \,\,\,{{\varepsilon \,k\,F_m \,\phi \,Q_0 } \over {\lambda ^2 }}{v \over L}\left[ {\lambda \,t\,\, - \,\,1\,\, + \,\,\exp ( - \lambda \,t)} \right]\,\,\, + \,\,\,{{\varepsilon \,k\,F_m \,\phi \,Q_0 } \over \lambda }\left( {1 - {{v\,t} \over L}} \right)\left[ {1\,\, - \,\,\exp ( - \lambda \,t)} \right]$$

=== Rectangular window (RW), time less than transit time T, LL ===
$$\dot C_{RW} (t)\,\,\, = \,\,\,\varepsilon \,k\,F_m \,\phi \,Q_0 \left( {t\,\, - \,\,{{v\,t^2 } \over {2L}}} \right)$$

Note that as v approaches zero, these RW equations reduce to the FF solutions.

=== Rectangular window (RW), time greater than or equal to transit time T, any half-life ===
$$\dot C_{RW} (t)\,\,\, = \,\,\,\varepsilon \,k\,F_m \,\phi \,Q_0 \,\,\left\{ {{1 \over \lambda }\,\,\, - \,\,\,{v \over {\lambda ^2 L}}\left[ {1\,\,\, - \,\,\,\exp \left( { - \lambda {L \over v}} \right)} \right]\,} \right\}$$

=== Rectangular window (RW), time greater than or equal to transit time T, LL ===
$$\dot C_{RW} (t)\,\,\, = \,\,\,\varepsilon \,k\,F_m \,\phi \,Q_0 \,{L \over {2\,v\,}}$$

=== Circular window (CW) responses ===
These response-model equations are quite complicated and some involve a nonelementary integral; the exact solutions can be found here. It is shown here, however, that a reasonable approximation for predicting the CW response can be obtained by using the RW equations above, with an “adjusted” window length L_{CW} used in each occurrence of the parameter L, except that the CW transit time T_{CW} is found from 2R / v, not from using L_{CW} as given here in the T_{RW} relation L / v. Thus,

$$L_{CW}  = \,\,{{16\,R} \over {3\,\pi }}\,\,\,\,\,\,\,\,\,\,\,\,\,\,\,\,T_{CW} \,\, = \,\,{{2R} \over v}\,\,\,\, \ne \,\,\,{{L_{CW} } \over v}\,\,\,\,\,\,\,\,\,\,\,\,T_{RW}  = \,\,{L \over v}$$

== Example CPAM response plots ==
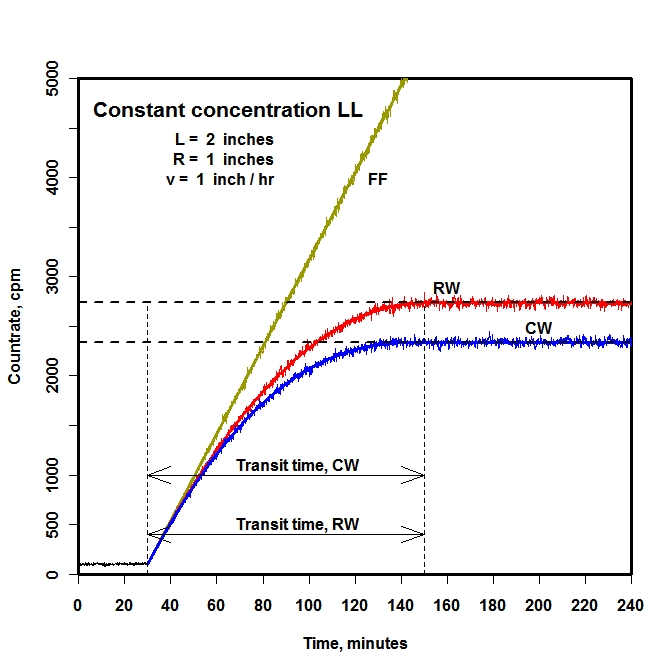
CPAM responses, constant concentration of LL activity. Transit time 120 min.

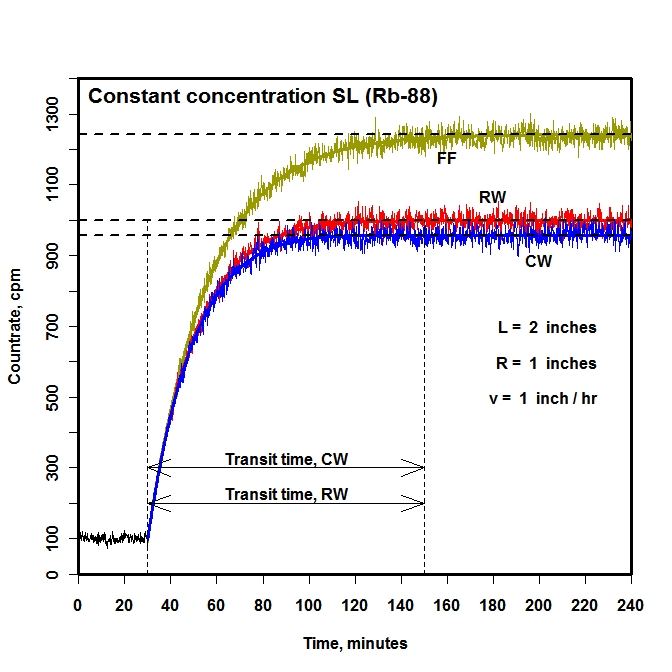
CPAM responses, constant concentration of SL activity (Rb-88). Transit time 120 min.

These plots show the predicted CPAM countrate responses for these parameter settings: Detection efficiency, 0.2; Flowrate, 5 cubic feet per minute (cfm); Collection efficiency, 0.7; Constant concentration, 1E-09 $\mu$Ci/cc; Rectangular window length, 2 inches; Circular window radius, 1 inch; Media (tape) speed, 1 inch/hour. The concentration instantly steps up to its constant value when the time reaches 30 minutes, and there is a 100 count per minute (cpm) constant background. Note: A microcurie ($\mu$Ci) is a measure of the disintegration rate, or activity, of a radioactive source; it is 2.22E06 disintegrations per minute.

In the LL plot, note that the FF countrate continues to increase. This is because there is no significant loss of radioactivity from the filter medium. The RW and CW monitors, on the other hand, approach a limiting countrate and the monitor response remains constant as long as the input concentration remains constant.

For the SL plot, all three monitor responses approach a constant level. For the FF monitor, this is due to the source and loss terms becoming equal; since ^{88}Rb has a half-life of about 18 minutes, the loss of radioactive material from the filter medium is significant. This loss also happens on the RW and CW monitors, but there, the loss due to the filter movement also plays a role.

In both plots, Poisson "noise" is added and a constant-gain digital filter is applied, emulating the countrate responses as they would be observed on a modern CPAM. The horizontal dotted lines are the limiting countrates calculated from the equations given in the previous section.

Also in both plots the transit times are indicated; note that these times are measured from the start of the concentration, at time 30 minutes, not from the arbitrary time zero of the plots. In these example graphs, the length of the RW and the diameter of the CW are equal; if they were not equal, then the transit times would not be equal.

== The inverse problem: estimating a concentration from the observed response ==
Having mathematical models that can predict the CPAM response, i.e., the monitor's output, for a defined input (airborne radioactive material concentration), it is natural to ask whether the process can be "inverted." That is, given an observed CPAM output, is it possible to estimate the input to the monitor?

=== A misleading "quantitative method" for moving-filter CPAMs ===
A number of approaches to this inverse problem are addressed in detail in. Each method has its advantages and disadvantages, as one might expect, and a method that might work well for a fixed-filter monitor may be useless for a moving-filter monitor (or vice versa).

One important conclusion from this paper is that for all practical purposes moving-filter monitors are not usable for quantitative estimation of a time-dependent concentration. The only moving-filter method that has been used historically involves a constant-concentration, LL assumption, which leads to the RW expression:

$$\dot C_{RW}\,\,\, = \,\,\,\varepsilon \,k\,F_m \,\phi \,Q_0 {T \over {2\,}}\,\,\,\,\,\,\,\,\,\,\,\, \Rightarrow \,\,\,\,\,\,\hat Q_0 \,\, = \,\,{{2\,v\,\dot C_{RW} } \over {\varepsilon \,k\,F_m \,\phi \,L}}$$

or for CW,

$$\dot C_{CW} \,\, = \,\,\,\varepsilon \,k\,F_m \,\phi \,Q_0 {{8R} \over {3\,\pi \,v}}\,\,\,\,\,\, \Rightarrow \,\,\,\,\,\,\hat Q_0 \,\, = \,\,{{3\,\pi \,v\,\dot C_{CW} } \over {8R\,\varepsilon \,k\,F_m \,\phi }}$$

Thus, a concentration estimate is available only after the transit time T has expired; in most CPAM applications this time is on the order of several (e.g., 4) hours. Whether it is reasonable to assume that the concentration will stay constant for this length of time, and to further assume that only long-lived nuclides are present, is at least debatable, and it is arguable that in many practical situations these assumptions are not realistic.

For example, in power reactor leak detection applications, as mentioned in the first section of this article, CPAMs are used, and a primary nuclide of interest is ^{88}Rb, which is far from long-lived (half-life 18 minutes). Also, in the dynamic environment of a reactor containment building the ^{88}Rb concentration would not be expected to remain constant on a time scale of hours, as required by this measurement method.

However, realistic or not, it has for decades been the practice of CPAM vendors to provide a set of curves (graphs) based on the expressions above. Such graphs have concentration on the vertical axis, and net countrate on the horizontal axis. There often is a family of curves, parameterized on the detection efficiency (or labeled as to specific nuclides). The implication in providing these graphs is that one is to observe a net countrate, at any time, enter the graph at this value, and read off the concentration that exists at that time. To the contrary, unless the time is greater than the transit time T, the nuclide of interest is long-lived, and the concentration is constant over the entire interval, this process will lead to incorrect concentration estimates.

=== Quantitative methods for CPAM applications ===
As discussed in the referenced paper, there are at least 11 possible quantitative methods for estimating the concentration or quantities derived from it. The "concentration" may only be at a specific time, or it might be an average over some time interval; this averaging is perfectly acceptable in some applications. In a few cases, the time-dependent concentration itself can be estimated. These various methods involve the countrate, the time derivative of the countrate, the time integral of the countrate, and various combinations of these.

The countrate is, as mentioned above, developed from the raw detector pulses by either an analog or digital ratemeter. The integrated counts are easily obtained simply by accumulating the pulses in a "scaler" or, in more modern implementations, in software. Estimating the rate of change (time derivative) of the countrate is difficult to do with any reasonable precision, but modern digital signal processing methods can be used to good effect.

It turns out that it is very useful to find the time integral of the concentration, as opposed to estimating the time-dependent concentration itself. It is essential to consider this choice for any CPAM application; in many cases the integrated concentration is not only more useful in a radiological protection sense, but is also more readily accomplished, since estimating a concentration in (more or less) real-time is difficult.

For example, the total activity released from a plant stack over a time interval $\eta$ is

$$R_{stack} \left( \eta  \right)\,\,\, = \,\,\,\int_0^\eta  {Q(\tau )\,F_{stack} (\tau )\,d\tau }$$

Then, for a fixed-filter monitor, assuming a constant stack and monitor flowrate, it can be shown that

$$R_{stack} \left( \eta  \right)\,\,\, = \,\,\,{{F_{stack} \left[ {\dot C\left( \eta  \right)\,\,\, + \,\,\,\lambda \,\int_0^\eta  {\dot C\left( \tau  \right)\,\,d\tau } } \right]} \over {\varepsilon \,k\,F_m \,\phi }}$$

so that the release is a function of both the countrate and integrated counts. This approach was implemented at the SM-1 Nuclear Power Plant in the late 1960s, for estimating the releases of episodic containment purges, with a predominant, and strongly time-varying, nuclide of ^{88}Rb. For a LL nuclide, the integral term vanishes, and the release depends only on the attained countrate. A similar equation applies for the occupational exposure situation, replacing the stack flowrate with a worker's breathing rate.

An interesting subtlety to these calculations is that the time in the CPAM response equations is measured from the start of a concentration transient, so that some method of detecting the resulting change in a noisy countrate must be developed. Again, this is a good application for statistical signal processing that is made possible by the use of computing power in modern CPAMs.

Which of these 11 methods to use for the applications discussed previously is not especially obvious, although there are some candidate methods that logically would be used in some applications and not in others. For example, the response time of a given CPAM quantitative method may be far too slow for some applications, and perfectly reasonable for others. The methods have varying sensitivities (detection capabilities; how small a concentration or quantity of radioactivity can reliably be detected) as well, and this must enter into the decision.

=== CPAM calibration ===
The calibration of a CPAM usually includes: (1) choosing a quantitative method; (2) estimating the parameters needed to implement that method, notably the detection efficiency for specified nuclides, as well as the sampling line loss and collection efficiency factors; (3) estimating, under specified conditions, the background response of the instrument, which is needed for calculating the detection sensitivity. This sensitivity is often called the minimum detectable concentration or MDC, assuming that a concentration is the quantity estimated by the selected quantitative method.

What is of interest for the MDC is the variability (not the level) of the CPAM background countrate. This variability is measured using the standard deviation; care must be taken to account for bias in this estimate due to the autocorrelation of the sequential monitor readings. The autocorrelation bias can make the calculated MDC significantly smaller than is actually the case, which in turn makes the monitor appear to be capable of reliably detecting smaller concentrations than it in fact can.

An uncertainty analysis for the estimated quantity (concentration, release, uptake) is also part of the calibration process. Other performance characteristics can be part of this process, such as estimating response time, estimating the effect of temperature changes on the monitor response, and so on.

== Table of radiation measurement quantities ==
This is given to show context of US and SI units.

Quantity	Name	Symbol	Unit	Year	System
Exposure (X)	röntgen	R	esu / 0.001293 g of air	1928	non-SI
Absorbed dose (D)			erg•g^{−1}	1950	non-SI
Absorbed dose (D)	rad	rad	100 erg•g^{−1}	1953	non-SI
Absorbed dose (D)	gray	Gy	J•kg^{−1}	1974	SI
Activity (A)	curie	Ci	3.7 × 10^{10} s^{−1}	1953	non-SI
Activity (A)	becquerel	Bq	s^{−1}	1974	SI
Dose equivalent (H)	röntgen equivalent man	rem	100 erg•g^{−1}	1971	non-SI
Dose equivalent (H)	sievert	Sv	J•kg^{−1}	1977	SI
Fluence (Φ)	(reciprocal area)		cm^{−2} or m^{−2}	1962	SI (m^{−2})

Although the United States Nuclear Regulatory Commission permits the use of the units curie, rad, and rem alongside SI units, the European Union European units of measurement directives required that their use for "public health ... purposes" be phased out by 31 December 1985.
