= ICAD =

ICAD may refer to:

- ICAD (software)
- iCAD Inc., a medical-device manufacturer headquartered in Nashua, New Hampshire
- Inhibitor of caspase-activated DNase, also called DFFA, a protein
- Inter-Agency Committee on Anti-Illegal Drugs of the Philippines
- International Committee Against Disappearances, Turkey
- ICAD school of learning, JEE and NEET preparing institute, based in India.
- International Community for Auditory Display
- Industrial City of Abu Dhabi
