= David Worrall (composer) =

Australian composer and sound artist (born 1954)

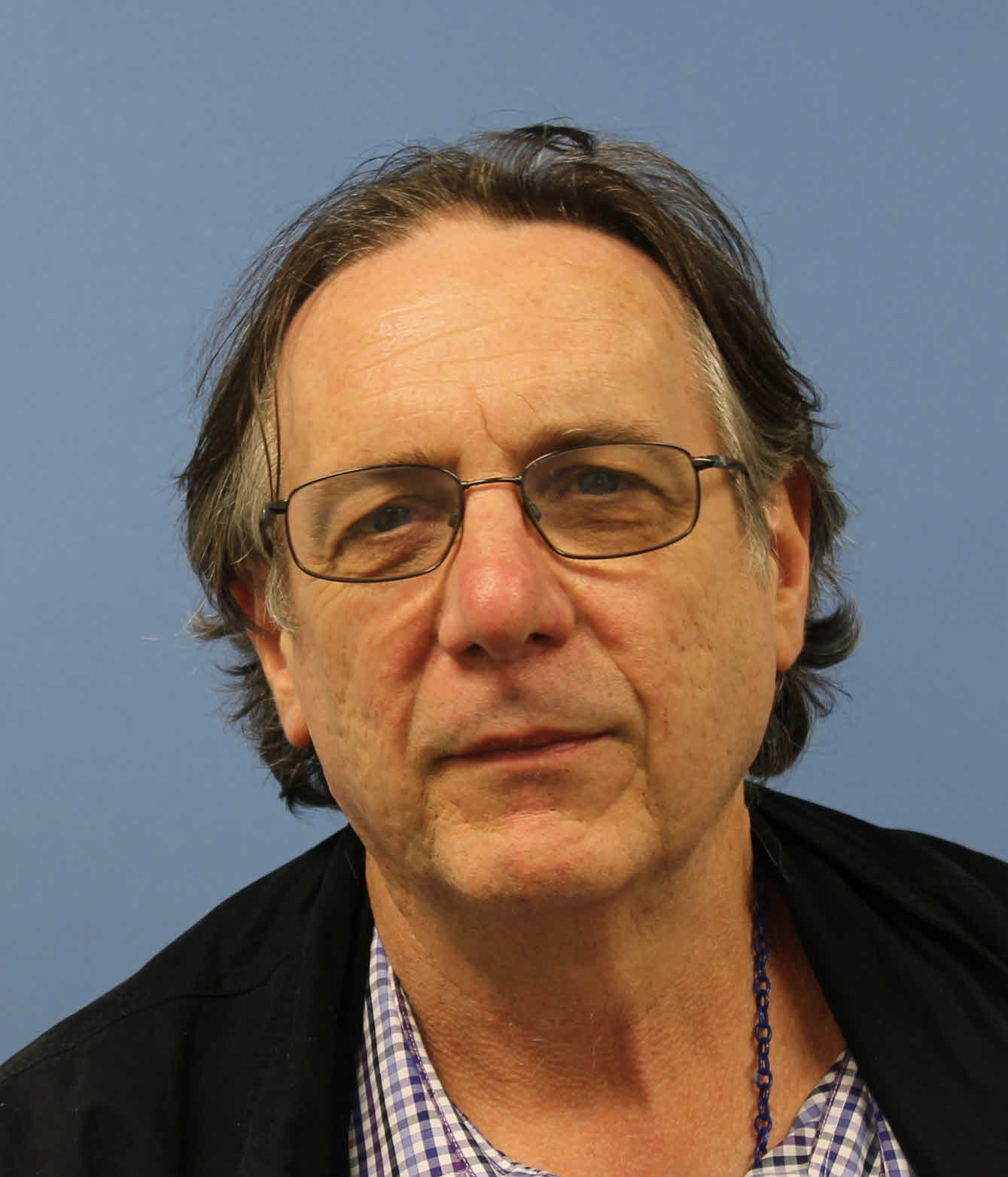
- Worrall in 2016
- Born: David Robert Worrall; 25 October 1954 (age 71); Newcastle, New South Wales, Australia
- Occupations: Composer, polymedia artist, information sonifier, academic

David Worrall (born 25 October 1954 in Newcastle NSW) is an Australian composer and sound artist working a range of genres, including data sonification, sound sculpture and immersive polymedia (a term he coined in 1986) as well as traditional instrumental music composition.

== Biography ==
Worrall performs and exhibits internationally. He studied musical composition at The University of Sydney with Peter Sculthorpe, Ross Edwards, where he also studied mathematics and Western philosophy, and at The University of Adelaide with Richard Meale and Tristram Cary.

Worrall's creative practice encompasses a number of endeavours: instrumental and electroacoustic composition, sound poetry and sound installations including those that utilise PIPES (Portable Immersive Polymedia Event Spaces). sometimes referred to as Portable Event Theatres (PETs). He is a programmer in several computer languages and has developed software for music composition, text transformation and sonification. His PhD dissertation was on the development of a software framework for the sonification of information in large or high-frequency multivariate data sets, such as those from securities trading engines.

Worrall was appointed to the Faculty of Music at the University of Melbourne in 1979 to teach musical composition and undertake research in computer music. In addition to composition, orchestration, twentieth-century techniques and free improvisation, in 1981, before the advent of the personal computer, he designed and taught the first undergraduate course in computer music in Australia using a mainframe computer, and MusicC (a development of Dick Moore's CMusic, the most related extant child of Max Mathews' Music V, Csound ) and Gary Lee Nelson's Music Programming Library (written in APL). His music from this period includes the Albert H. Maggs Award commission Images for Two Pianos and the Seymour Group commissioned Glass Games for ensemble and computer–generated tape – the first Australian work in this format. Other notable works from this period include Mixtures and re-collections and ...with fish scales scattered....

In 1986 he was appointed director of the Electronic Music Studios at the Canberra School of Music. He established and became the foundation head of the Australian Centre for the Arts and Technology (ACAT), at the Australian National University in 1989, a position he held for over a decade. During that time, ACAT offered the first Australian postgraduate degrees in multimedia: considered a sub-discipline of the Electronic Arts, along with electroacoustic music and computer animation. Worrall's output from this period is dominated by electroacoustic (e.g. Harmonie du Soir), polymedia (e.g. Cords), computer animation soundtracks (e.g. En Passant Marcel Duchamp) as well as his continued interest in combining acoustic instruments with electroacoustics (e.g. Air).

Worrall has been a regional editor for Organised Sound (Cambridge University Press) since 1996. From 2000 to 2012 he worked as an independent investment educator, academic, and freelance experimental composer (e.g. The Twins) and researcher with a growing interest in the human voice, both acoustic and synthetic (e.g. algorithmic poems such as A doing resounds and the extended text-to-speech work (e.g. I am on the net through an interface different from the one which you use when you do, a homage to Alvin Lucier,) as well as the continued development of PIPES works such as the large-scale collaborative Alien Garden.

He was a senior research fellow (2013–2017) in sonification in the Emerging Audio Research Group at Fraunhofer Society (the International Audio Laboratories of Fraunhofer-Institut für Integrierte Schaltungen IIS) in Erlangen, Germany, undertaking research in the application of sound in the diagnosis of sleep apnoea and the sonification of large networks. He is currently a professor (and former chair) in the Audio Arts and Acoustics Department at Columbia College Chicago and an adjunct senior research fellow in the School of Music, the Australian National University.

His book: Sonification design: From data to intelligible soundfields is published by Springer in their Human–Computer Interaction Series.

Worrall has won various composition and research awards and has held artist-in-residence and visiting fellowship positions in universities in Australia, France, Spain, the US and in the UK, where most notably he was Leverhulme Fellow in the Music Department at the University of York in 1996. He was a founding member of the Music Council of Australia, now Music Australia, which made him an Honorary Life Member in 2009, the Electronic Music Foundation and has served on a number of organisational boards, including the Australia Council's Music and Innovative Projects (later Mixed Media) Boards, the Australian Music Centre, where he is a represented artist, and as president in 1998/1999 of the Australasian Computer Music Association. He has been and a board member of the International Community for Auditory Display (ICAD) since 2010 and their elected President 2016–2019.
