= International Community for Auditory Display =

Research organisation in auditory display

The International Community for Auditory Display (ICAD), founded in 1992, provides an annual conference for research in auditory display, the use of sound to display information. Research and implementation of sonification, audification, earcons and speech synthesis are central interests of the ICAD.

ICAD is home to auditory display researchers, who come from different disciplines, through its conference and peer-reviewed proceedings. Auditory display researchers have various backgrounds in science, arts, and humanities, like computer science, cognitive science, human factors, systematic musicology and soundscape design.

Most of the proceedings are freely available through the Georgia Tech SMARTech repository.

Auditory display professionals are board members of ICAD.

This ICAD presidency has been held by Gregory Kramer (1992 - 1997), Jim Ballas (1997 - 2000), Eric Somers (2000–2003), Matti Gröhn (2003 - 2006), Bruce Walker (2006 - 2011), Tony Stockman (2011 - 2016), David Worrall (2016 - 2018), and Myounghoon 'Philart' Jeon (2018 - 2022). The current president of ICAD is Paul Vickers.
