= Counts per minute =

Measurement for ionizing radiation

The measurement of ionizing radiation is sometimes expressed as being a rate of counts per unit time as registered by a radiation monitoring instrument, for which counts per minute (cpm) and counts per second (cps) are commonly used quantities.

Count rate measurements are associated with the detection of particles, such as alpha particles and beta particles. However, for gamma ray and X-ray dose measurements a unit such as the sievert is normally used.

Both cpm and cps are the rate of detection events registered by the measuring instrument, not the rate of emission from the source of radiation. For radioactive decay measurements it must not be confused with disintegrations per unit time (dpm), which represents the rate of atomic disintegration events at the source of the radiation.

== Count rates ==
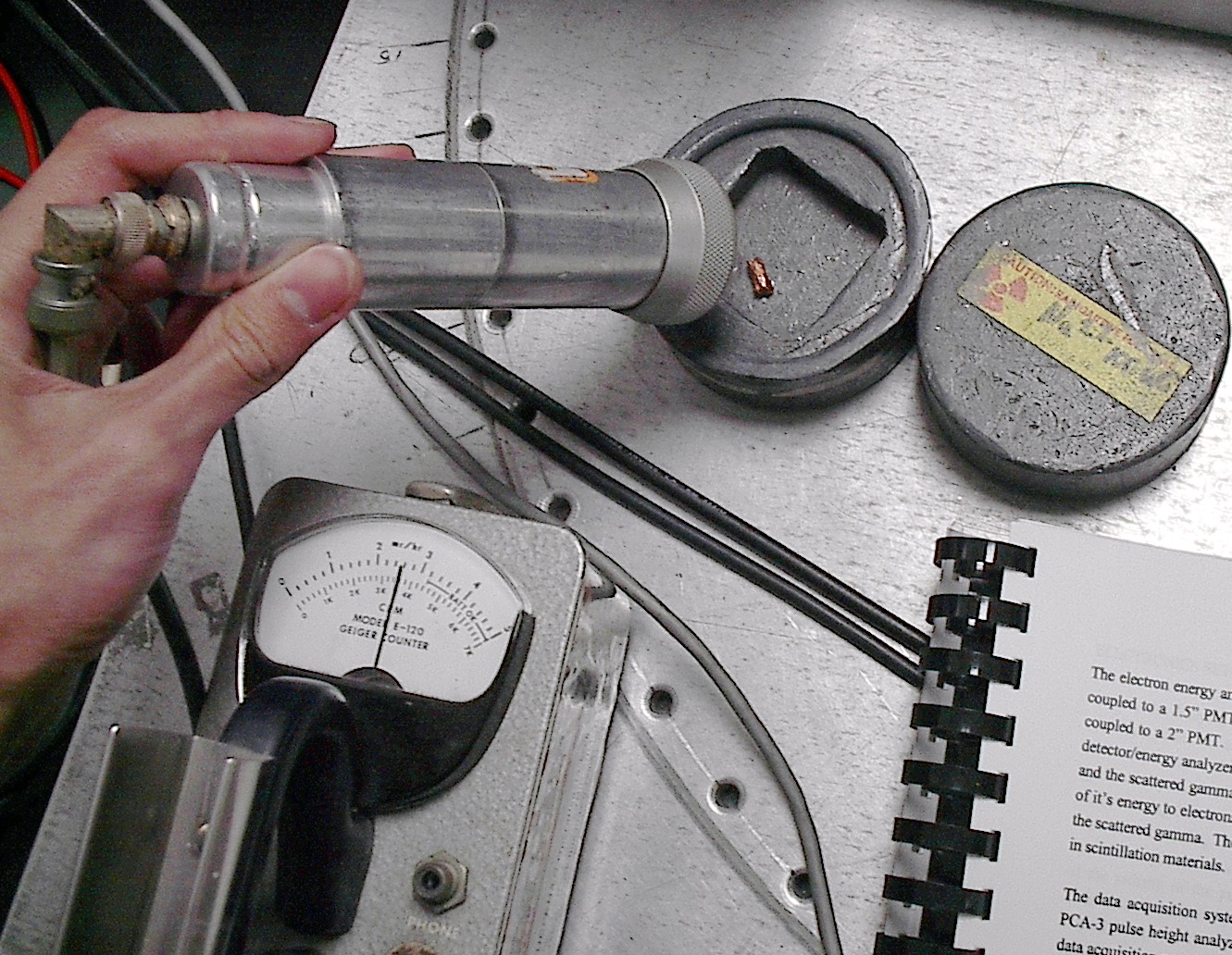
Geiger-Müller counter with dual counts/dose rate display measuring a "point source". The dose per count is known for this specific instrument by calibration

The count rates of cps and cpm are generally accepted and convenient practical rate measurements. They are not SI units, but are de facto radiological units of measure in widespread use.

Counts per minute (abbreviated to cpm) is a measure of the detection rate of ionization events per minute. Counts are only manifested in the reading of the measuring instrument, and are not an absolute measure of the strength of the source of radiation. Whilst an instrument will display a rate of cpm, it does not have to detect counts for one minute, as it can infer the total per minute from a smaller sampling period.

Counts per second (abbreviated to cps) is used for measurements when higher count rates are being encountered, or if hand held radiation survey instruments are being used which can be subject to rapid changes of count rate when the instrument is moved over a source of radiation in a survey area.

== Conversion to dose rate ==
Count rate does not universally equate to dose rate, and there is no simple universal conversion factor. Any conversions are instrument-specific.

Counts is the number of events detected, but dose rate relates to the amount of ionising energy deposited in the sensor of the radiation detector. The conversion calculation is dependent on the radiation energy levels, the type of radiation being detected and the radiometric characteristic of the detector.

The continuous current ion chamber instrument can easily measure dose but cannot measure counts. However the Geiger counter can measure counts but not the energy of the radiation, so a technique known as energy compensation of the detector tube is used to produce a dose reading. This modifies the tube characteristic so each count resulting from a particular radiation type is equivalent to a specific quantity of deposited dose.

More can be found on radiation dose and dose rate at absorbed dose and equivalent dose.

== Count rates versus disintegration rates ==
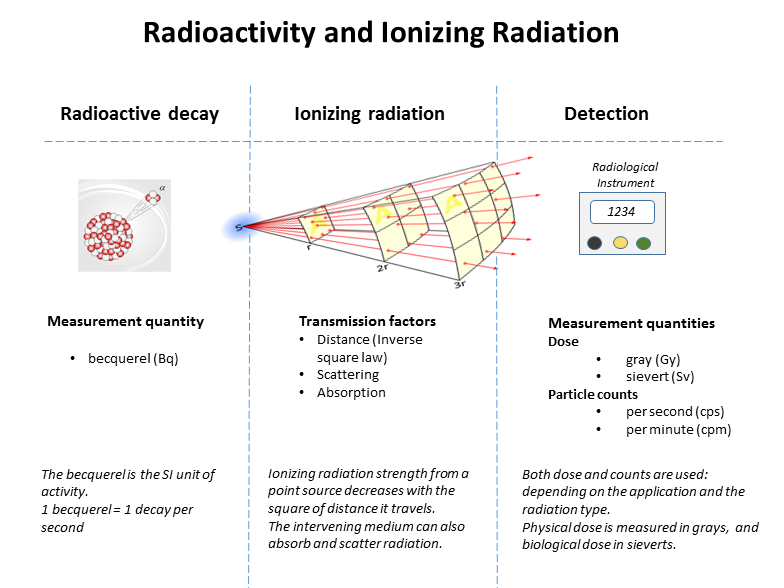
Graphic showing relationships between radioactivity and detected ionizing radiation.

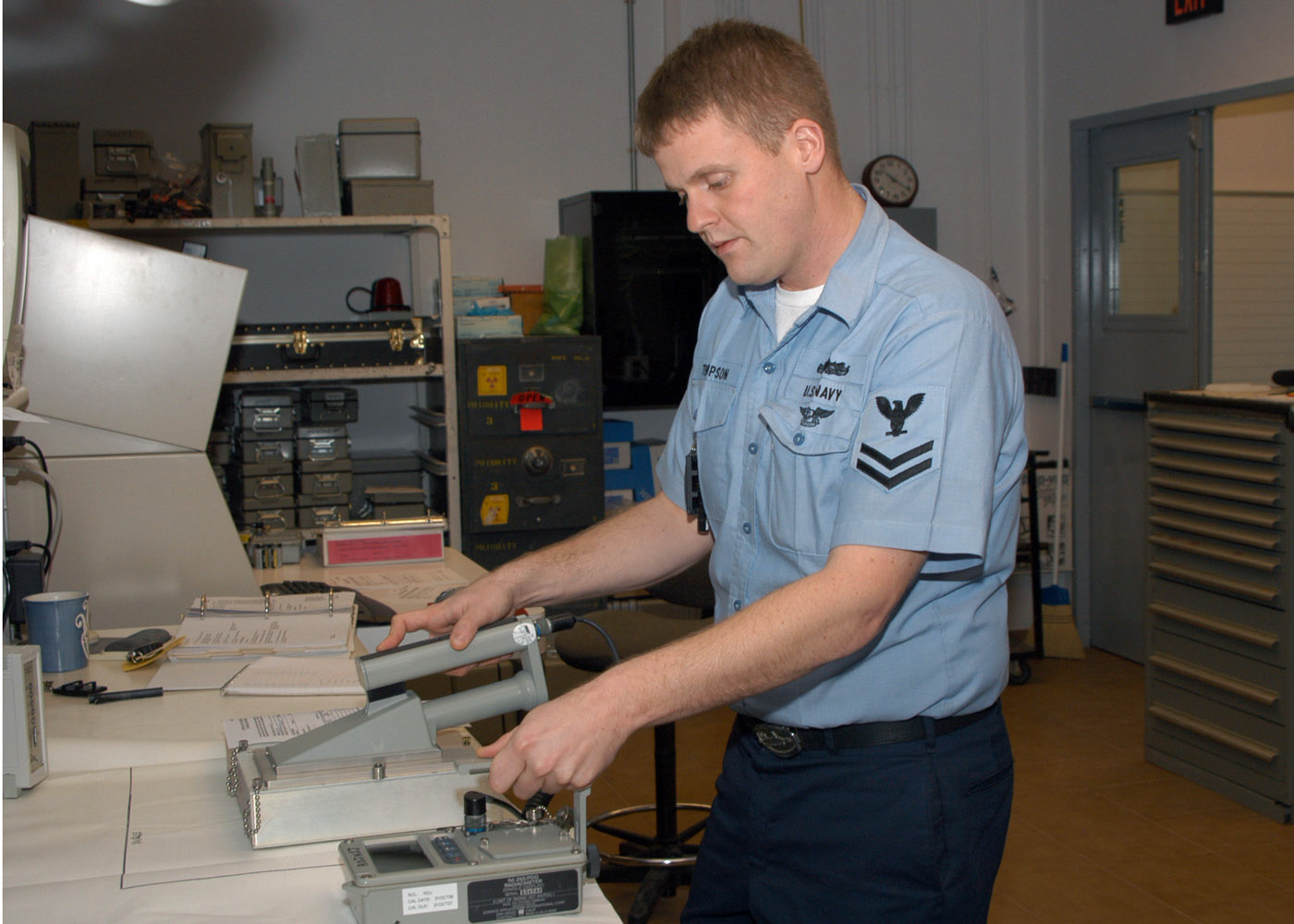
Hand-held large area alpha scintillation probe under calibration using a plate source near to the detector.

Disintegrations per minute (dpm) and disintegrations per second (dps) are measures of the activity of the source of radioactivity. The SI unit of radioactivity, the becquerel (Bq), is equivalent to one disintegration per second. This unit should not be confused with cps, which is the number of counts received by an instrument from the source. The quantity dps (dpm) is the number of atoms that have decayed in one second (one minute), not the number of atoms that have been measured as decayed.

The efficiency of the radiation detector and its relative position to the source of radiation must be accounted for when relating cpm to dpm. This is known as the counting efficiency. The factors affecting counting efficiency are shown in the accompanying diagram.

== Surface emission rate ==
The surface emission rate (SER) is used as a measure of the rate of particles emitted from a radioactive source which is being used as a calibration standard. When the source is of plate or planar construction and the radiation of interest is emitting from one face, it is known as "$2\pi$ emission". When the emissions are from a "point source" and the radiation of interest is emitting from all faces, it is known as "$4\pi$ emission". These terms correspond to the spherical geometry over which the emissions are being measured.

The SER is the measured emission rate from the source and is related to, but different from, the source activity. This relationship is affected by the type of radiation being emitted and the physical nature of the radioactive source. Sources with $4\pi$ emissions will nearly always have a lower SER than the Bq activity due to self-shielding within the active layer of the source. Sources with $2\pi$ emissions suffer from self-shielding or backscatter, so the SER is variable, and individually can be greater than or less than 50% of the Bq activity, depending on construction and the particle types being measured. Backscatter will reflect particles off the backing plate of the active layer and will increase the rate; beta particle plate sources usually have a significant backscatter, whereas alpha plate sources usually have no backscatter. However alpha particles are easily attenuated if the active layer is made too thick. The SER is established by measurement using calibrated equipment, normally traceable to a national standard source of radiation.

== Ratemeters and scalers ==
In radiation protection practice, an instrument which reads a rate of detected events is normally known as a ratemeter, which was first developed by Robley D Evans in 1939. This mode of operation provides real-time dynamic indication of the radiation rate, and the principle has found widespread application in radiation survey meters used in health physics.

An instrument which totalises the events detected over a time period is known as a scaler. This colloquial name comes from the early days of automatic radiation counting, when a pulse-dividing circuit was required to "scale down" a high count rate to a speed which mechanical counters could register. This technique was developed by C E Wynn-Williams at The Cavendish Laboratory and first published in 1932. The original counters used a cascade of "Eccles-Jordan" divide-by-two circuits, today known as flip flops. Early count readings were therefore binary numbers and had to be manually re-calculated into decimal values.

Later, with the development of electronic indicators, which started with the introduction of the Dekatron readout tube in the 1950s, and culminating in the modern digital indicator, totalised readings came to be directly indicated in decimal notation.

=== SI Units for radioactive disintegration ===
- One becquerel (Bq) is equal to one disintegration per second; 1 becquerel (Bq) is equal to 60 dpm.
- One curie (Ci) an old non-SI unit is equal to 3.7×10^{10} Bq or dps, which is equal to 2.22×10^{12} dpm.

Ionizing radiation related quantities
Quantity	Unit	Symbol	Derivation	Year	SI equivalent
Activity (A)	becquerel	Bq	s^{−1}	1974	SI unit
Activity (A)	curie	Ci	3.7×10^{10} s^{−1}	1953	3.7×10^{10} Bq
Activity (A)	rutherford	Rd	10^{6} s^{−1}	1946	1000000 Bq
Exposure (X)	coulomb per kilogram	C/kg	C⋅kg^{−1} of air	1974	SI unit
Exposure (X)	röntgen	R	esu / 0.001293 g of air	1928	2.58×10^{−4} C/kg
Absorbed dose (D)	gray	Gy	J⋅kg^{−1}	1974	SI unit
Absorbed dose (D)	erg per gram	erg/g	erg⋅g^{−1}	1950	1.0×10^{−4} Gy
Absorbed dose (D)	rad	rad	100 erg⋅g^{−1}	1953	0.010 Gy
Equivalent dose (H)	sievert	Sv	J⋅kg^{−1} × W_{R}	1977	SI unit
Equivalent dose (H)	röntgen equivalent man	rem	100 erg⋅g^{−1} × W_{R}	1971	0.010 Sv
Effective dose (E)	sievert	Sv	J⋅kg^{−1} × W_{R} × W_{T}	1977	SI unit
Effective dose (E)	röntgen equivalent man	rem	100 erg⋅g^{−1} × W_{R} × W_{T}	1971	0.010 Sv
