= Data sonification =

Presentation of data as sound

The sound of a geiger counter. One of the first examples of data sonification.

Data sonification is the presentation of data as sound using sonification. It is the auditory equivalent of the more established practice of data visualization.

== Process ==
The usual process for data sonification is directing digital media of a dataset through a software synthesizer and into a digital-to-analog converter to produce sound for humans to experience. Benefits to interpreting data through sonification include accessibility, pattern recognition, education, and artistic expression.

== Applications ==
Applications of data sonification include astronomy studies of star creation, interpreting cluster analysis, and geoscience. Various projects describe the production of sonifications as a collaboration between scientists and musicians.

A target demographic for using data sonification is the blind community because of the inaccessibility of data visualizations.

One of the earliest examples of data sonification is the Geiger counter, which measures ionizing radiation through sound. Another notable example of data sonification is NASA's processing of images from space telescopes into sounds.

== See also ==
- Audification - subset of sonification which is the auditory equivalent of visual design, including data sonification within the broad field of design
- Auditory display - equivalent of a computer monitor, except with sound

== Further media ==
- Kramer, Gregory, ed. (1994). Auditory display : sonification, audification, and auditory interfaces. Addison-Wesley. ISBN 978-0201626049.
