= Auditory display =

Use of sound to communicate information from a computer to the user

Auditory display is the use of sound to communicate information from a computer to the user. The primary forum for exploring these techniques is the International Community for Auditory Display (ICAD), which was founded by Gregory Kramer in 1992 as a forum for research in the field.

== Types of auditory display ==
- Audification: a technique for listening to a large time series by mapping values directly to sound pressure levels
- Sonification: the use of non-speech audio to convey information or perceptualize data
- Earcons / auditory icons: brief, distinctive sounds used to represent a specific event or convey other information
- Voice messaging: the automated use of speech synthesis or recorded speech samples to convey precise statements

== Benefits and limitations ==
Auditory display enables eyes-free usage for blind users (via a screen reader) as well as sighted users who are using their eyes for other tasks. A rapid detection of acoustic signals and the omnidirectional feature of the sense of hearing can contribute to the effectiveness of an auditory display even when vision is available. On the other hand, sound output may interfere with other acoustic signals, such as speech communication. This complicates the use of auditory displays for certain applications. Furthermore, acoustic output may be annoying or distracting.
