= Rory Viner =

Canadian sound artist (born 1983)

- Born: Rory Viner; May 31, 1983 (age 42); London, Ontario, Canada
- Known for: Sound art, installation art, experimental music

Rory Viner (born May 31, 1983) is a Canadian sound artist, experimental composer and installation artist, based in Tokyo, Japan.

== Career ==
His works focus on interpreting data, either gathered by the artist or publicly available, into musical arrangements: "Mapping them to music allows data that is usually cold, distant and sterile to become more emotionally felt and immediate. In a way, it is a type of synesthesia, allowing a mixing of senses, or in this case, ways of thinking and experiencing the world."

His first data sonification work to receive international press attention was 2014's One Year of Suicides in Japan on Piano, which The Japan Times has called a "provocative composition" and Wired magazine has called "a haunting piano score". The sonification of Japanese suicide data was followed by similar projects mapping American crime statistics.

Viner's second work to achieve widespread recognition was the more personal Sex, Sensors & Sound, called "melancholic and beautiful" by Motherboard, Vice's online magazine and video channel. Sonification of kinetic data created by "strapping movement sensors across his and his partner's bodies during intercourse, feeding the signal to software programmed to respond with synthesizer notes, and playing the output back live." Sex, Sensors & Soun has been featured in numerous publications worldwide.

== Works ==
- One Year of Suicides in Japan on Piano (2014)
- American Rape Statistics by State for Pian (2014)
- American Murder Statistics for Piano (2014)
- Sex, Sensors & Music (2015)
- Solar Future (installation) (2015)
