= ICAD Inc. =

American company

iCAD Inc.
- Company type: Public
- Traded as: Nasdaq: ICAD; Russell Microcap Index component
- Founded: 1984; 42 years ago
- Headquarters: Nashua, New Hampshire, U.S.
- Key people: Michael Klein (CEO); Eric Lonnqvist (CFO); Michelle Strong (COO)
- Owner: RadNet, Inc.
- Website: icadmed.com

iCAD Inc. is a medical device manufacturer based in Nashua, New Hampshire, USA, that offers computer aided detection (CAD) to support detection of breast, prostate and colorectal cancers. Its technology platforms also include hardware and software for radiation therapy treatment.

On July 17, 2025, it was announced that the company had been acquired by DeepHealth, a wholly-owned subsidiary of the American radiology firm RadNet, Inc.

== History ==
Founded in 1984 as Howtek, Inc., it developed, manufactured and marketed digitizing systems or scanners. The scanners converted printed, photographic and other hard copy images to digital form for use in the graphic arts, photo finishing and medical industries.

From 1984 to 2000 Howtek successfully developed a series of products that improved the quality of digital imaging while reducing the price and complexity of digitizing systems. In 2001, foreseeing a decline in the graphic arts and photo finishing industries, Howtek elected to focus solely on the medical imaging market. The company acquired Intelligent Systems Software, Inc. (ISSI) which had developed an approved CAD system for breast cancer. Subsequently, the company acquired Qualia Computing, Inc. of Ohio and its subsidiary, CADx Systems, Inc. These acquisitions brought together two of the three companies with clearance from the Food and Drug Administration (FDA) to market CAD solutions for breast cancer in the United States.

iCAD originally focused on image-analysis products designed to help radiologists and other health-care providers detect cancers early. In December 2010, iCAD expanded the company's oncology footprint by acquiring Xoft, Inc. It acquired Xoft's Axxent system, which delivers radiation therapy directly to cancer sites with minimal radiation exposure to surrounding healthy tissue, according to the company. The system was approved in the U.S. for treatment of early-stage breast cancer, endometrial cancer and skin cancer, as well as other varieties where radiation therapy is indicated. The shield used in the system had been cleared by the FDA in June 2009 in an abbreviated process used for devices that are considered equivalent to products already on the market. That process, known as 510(k), takes less time than the procedure used to approve a new device, and it generally does not require tests on humans.

=== Trends in healthcare ===
iCAD continues to experience a period of growth in its cancer therapy business. Radiation treatment for breast, skin, and gynecological cancers is moving from conventional external beam therapy to shorter duration, more targeted therapy. The advantages of the Xoft System, which is FDA cleared for treatment anywhere in the body, have significant potential to improve patient care and quality of life.

iCAD is also applying its patented technology and algorithms to the development of CAD solutions for use with digital mammography and CT Colonography (CTC). The company is also increasing distribution through large OEM partners, such as General Electric (GE).

=== Tungsten particles left in test subjects ===
Within a week of iCAD's closing on the Xoft acquisition, the Axxent FlexiShield Mini, used with its portable radiation device, the Axxent Electronic Brachytherapy System, was found to have left test subjects "riddled ... with hundreds of tiny particles of the heavy metal tungsten in their breast tissue and chest muscles." Twenty-seven of the cases occurred at Hoag Memorial Hospital Presbyterian in Newport Beach, Orange County, California. Eleven of those women have had mammograms, and all 11 showed tungsten. Two other women were treated in a study at Karmanos-Crittenton Cancer Center in Rochester Hills, Michigan. Full implications of the mistake had not been determined as of March 2011, but the company and the FDA had executed a recall on the FlexiShield Mini and were investigating.

Swedish Covenant Hospital in Chicago offered Xoft's Axxent Electronic Brachytherapy System treatment, beginning in 2008. The hospital did not participate in the study in which the Axxent FlexiShield Mini — the device that has been recalled — was used in conjunction with intraoperative breast irradiation, nor has the hospital used the Axxent FlexiShield Mini on any patients.

Starting in February 2011, a series of parallel product liability suits have been filed in Orange Country Superior Court, totaling ten Jane Doe complainants and a number of John Doe spouses by August 2011, per the September 30, 2011 10-Q filing by the company. The first and later of the plaintiffs, who consented to the experimental treatment, were represented by lawyer Jeff Milman.

In July 2011, Zach's Investment Research initiated coverage of the stock with a neutral rating and "positive on iCAD's fundamentals" but said "we believe caution is warranted until there is more clarity on the potential and likely liability related to a recently filed product liability lawsuit". While the company reported "strong revenue growth" for the first nine months of 2011, it also reported lawsuit and other legal expenses of $1.5 million as a component of a "Non GAAP Adjusted EBITDA" of negative $6.8 million.

In January 2013, an Inflection Point Investing stock analyst wrote in part, under "Risks": "Potential legal liability for a third-party related recall for a Xoft accessory product remains a small concern. We do not feel that this risk is material or anything to dwell upon."

=== Reimbursement rates raised ===
In November, 2012, the company's products were granted a more-than-doubled reimbursement rate from U.S. Centers for Medicare & Medicaid Services "for the Company’s Xoft Axxent Electronic Brachytherapy System". The news led to a spike in stock volume and the price began to move, more than doubling by mid-January 2013. At that time, noting the move already made by the stock, a stock analyst reviewed the company's history and situation. With standard caveats, the analyst wrote that recent developments "could cause shares to double in a year and potentially triple over the next 24 months".

=== Financial results ===
In the first quarter of 2020, iCAD had a GAAP net loss of $11.8m, and a non-GAAP adjusted net loss of $3.9m. Total revenues were $6.6m, with cash and cash equivalents of $14.3m. In April 2020, iCAD closed a registered direct offering for gross proceeds of ~$12.5 million.

The company stated that they "intend to continue to invest in targeted growth initiatives such as brain cancer to drive the business over the long term."
