= Scintillation counter =

Instrument for measuring ionizing radiation

Schematic showing incident high energy photon hitting a scintillating crystal, triggering the release of low-energy photons which are then converted into photoelectrons and multiplied in the photomultiplier

A scintillation counter is an instrument for detecting and measuring ionizing radiation by using the excitation effect of incident radiation on a scintillating material, and detecting the resultant light pulses.

It consists of a scintillator which generates photons in response to incident radiation, a sensitive photodetector (usually a photomultiplier tube (PMT), a charge-coupled device (CCD) camera, or a photodiode), which converts the light to an electrical signal and electronics to process this signal.

Scintillation counters are widely used in radiation protection, assay of radioactive materials and physics research because they can be made inexpensively yet with good quantum efficiency, and can measure both the intensity and the energy of incident radiation.

== History ==
The first electronic scintillation counter was invented in 1944 by Sir Samuel Curran whilst he was working on the Manhattan Project at the University of California at Berkeley. There was a requirement to measure the radiation from small quantities of uranium, and his innovation was to use one of the newly available highly sensitive photomultiplier tubes made by the Radio Corporation of America to accurately count the flashes of light from a scintillator subjected to radiation.

This built upon the work of earlier researchers such as Antoine Henri Becquerel, who discovered radioactivity whilst working on the phosphorescence of uranium salts in 1896. Previously, scintillation events had to be laboriously detected by eye, using a spinthariscope (a simple microscope) to observe light flashes in the scintillator. The first commercial liquid scintillation counter was made by Lyle E. Packard and sold to Argonne Cancer Research Hospital at the University of Chicago in 1953. The production model was designed especially for tritium and carbon-14 which were used in metabolic studies in vivo and in vitro.

== Operation ==
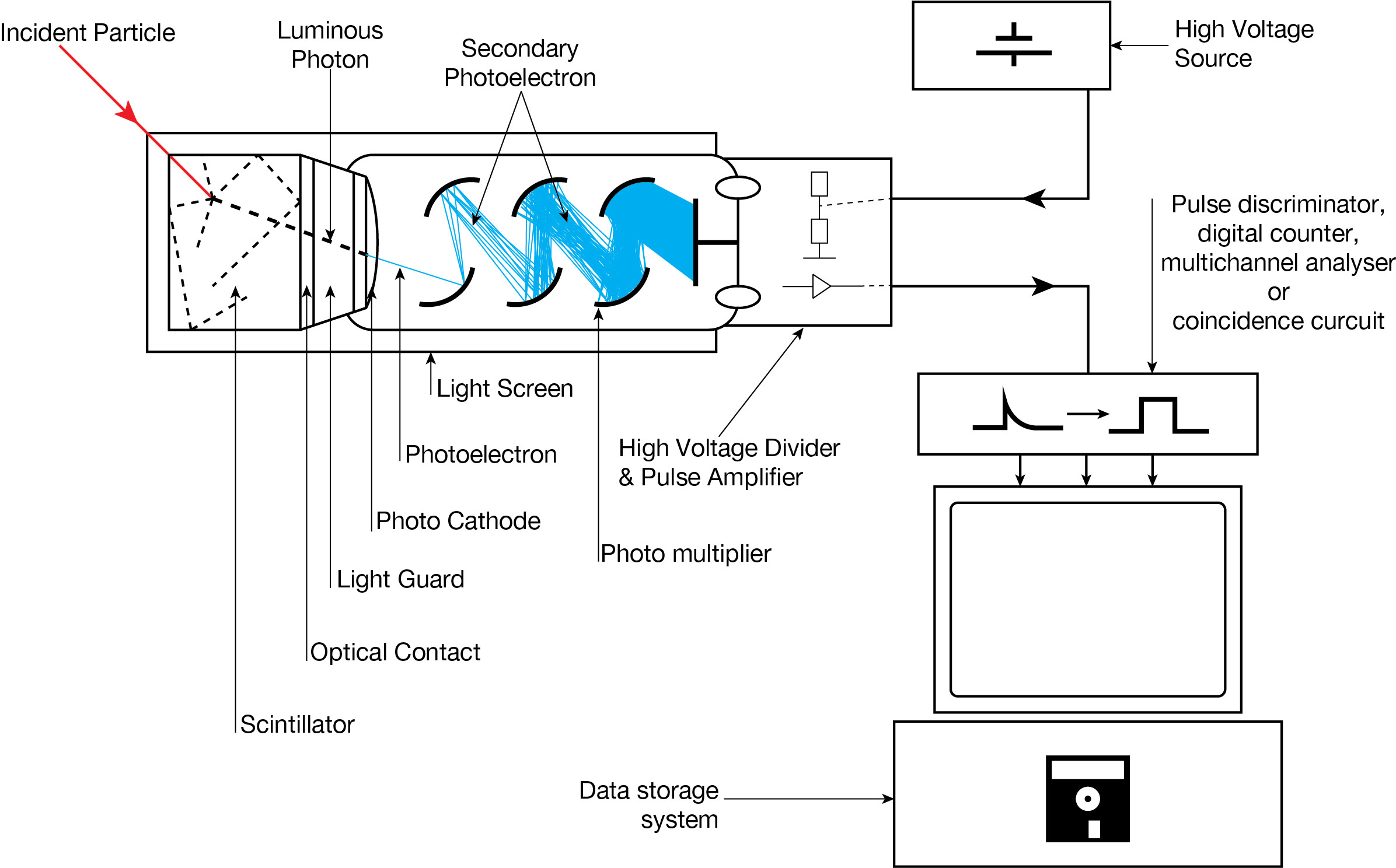
Apparatus with a scintillating crystal, photomultiplier, and data acquisition components.

animation of radiation scintillation counter using a photomultiplier tube.

When an ionizing particle passes into the scintillator material, atoms are excited along a track. For charged particles the track is the path of the particle itself. For gamma rays (uncharged), their energy is converted to an energetic electron via either the photoelectric effect, Compton scattering or pair production.

The chemistry of atomic de-excitation in the scintillator produces a multitude of low-energy photons, typically near the blue end of the visible spectrum. The quantity is proportional to the energy deposited by the ionizing particle. These can be directed to the photocathode of a photomultiplier tube which emits at most one electron for each arriving photon due to the photoelectric effect. This group of primary electrons is electrostatically accelerated and focused by an electrical potential so that they strike the first dynode of the tube. The impact of a single electron on the dynode releases a number of secondary electrons which are in turn accelerated to strike the second dynode. Each subsequent dynode impact releases further electrons, and so there is a current amplifying effect at each dynode stage. Each stage is at a higher potential than the previous to provide the accelerating field.

The resultant output signal at the anode is a measurable pulse for each group of photons from an original ionizing event in the scintillator that arrived at the photocathode and carries information about the energy of the original incident radiation. When it is fed to a charge amplifier which integrates the energy information, an output pulse is obtained which is proportional to the energy of the particle exciting the scintillator.

The number of such pulses per unit time also gives information about the intensity of the radiation. In some applications individual pulses are not counted, but rather only the average current at the anode is used as a measure of radiation intensity.

The scintillator must be shielded from all ambient light so that external photons do not swamp the ionization events caused by incident radiation. To achieve this a thin opaque foil, such as aluminized mylar, is often used, though it must have a low enough mass to minimize undue attenuation of the incident radiation being measured.

The article on the photomultiplier tube carries a detailed description of the tube's operation.

== Detection materials ==
The scintillator consists of a transparent crystal, usually a phosphor, plastic (usually containing anthracene) or organic liquid (see liquid scintillation counting) that fluoresces when struck by ionizing radiation.

Cesium iodide (CsI) in crystalline form is used as the scintillator for the detection of protons and alpha particles. Sodium iodide (NaI) containing a small amount of thallium is used as a scintillator for the detection of gamma rays and zinc sulfide (ZnS) is widely used as a detector of alpha particles. Zinc sulfide is the material Rutherford used to perform his scattering experiment. Lithium iodide (LiI) is used in neutron detectors.

== Detector efficiencies ==
=== Gamma ===
The quantum efficiency of a gamma-ray detector (per unit volume) depends upon the density of electrons in the detector, and certain scintillating materials, such as sodium iodide and bismuth germanate, achieve high electron densities as a result of the high atomic numbers of some of the elements of which they are composed. However, detectors based on semiconductors, notably hyperpure germanium, have better intrinsic energy resolution than scintillators, and are preferred where feasible for gamma-ray spectrometry.

=== Neutron ===
In the case of neutron detectors, high efficiency is gained through the use of scintillating materials rich in hydrogen that scatter neutrons efficiently. Liquid scintillation counters are an efficient and practical means of quantifying beta radiation.

== Applications ==
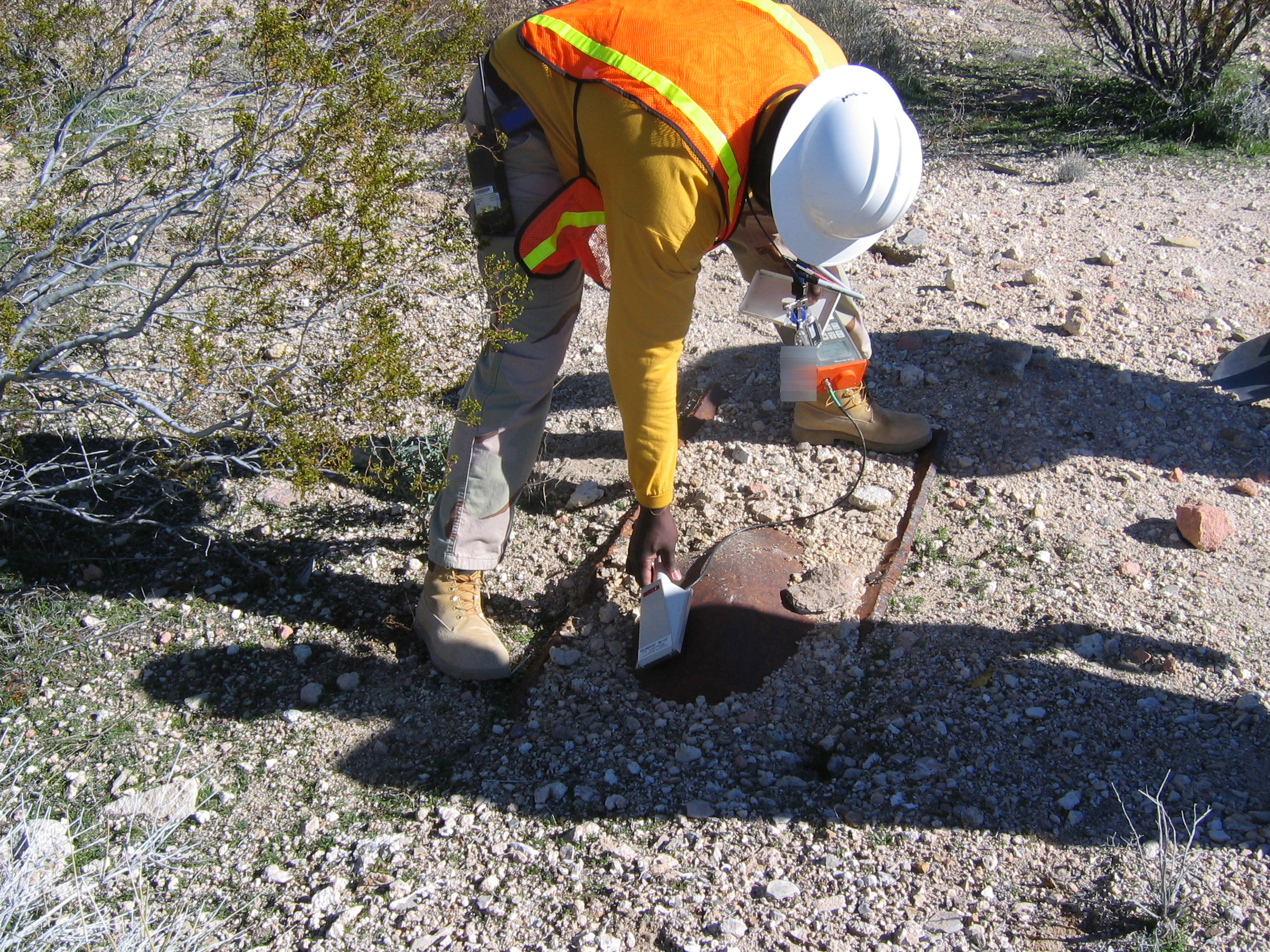
Scintillation probe being used to measure surface radioactive contamination. The probe is held as close to the object as practicable

Scintillation counters are used to measure radiation in a variety of applications including hand held radiation survey meters, personnel and environmental monitoring for radioactive contamination, medical imaging, radiometric assay, nuclear security and nuclear plant safety.

Several products have been introduced in the market utilising scintillation counters for detection of potentially dangerous gamma-emitting materials during transport. These include scintillation counters designed for freight terminals, border security, ports, weigh bridge applications, scrap metal yards and contamination monitoring of nuclear waste. There are variants of scintillation counters mounted on pick-up trucks and helicopters for rapid response in case of a security situation due to dirty bombs or radioactive waste. Hand-held units are also commonly used.

=== Diffusion cloud chamber ===
In the United Kingdom, the Health and Safety Executive, or HSE, has issued a user guidance note on selecting the correct radiation measurement instrument for the application concerned. This covers all radiation instrument technologies, and is a useful comparative guide to the use of scintillation detectors.

== Radiation protection ==
=== Alpha and beta contamination ===
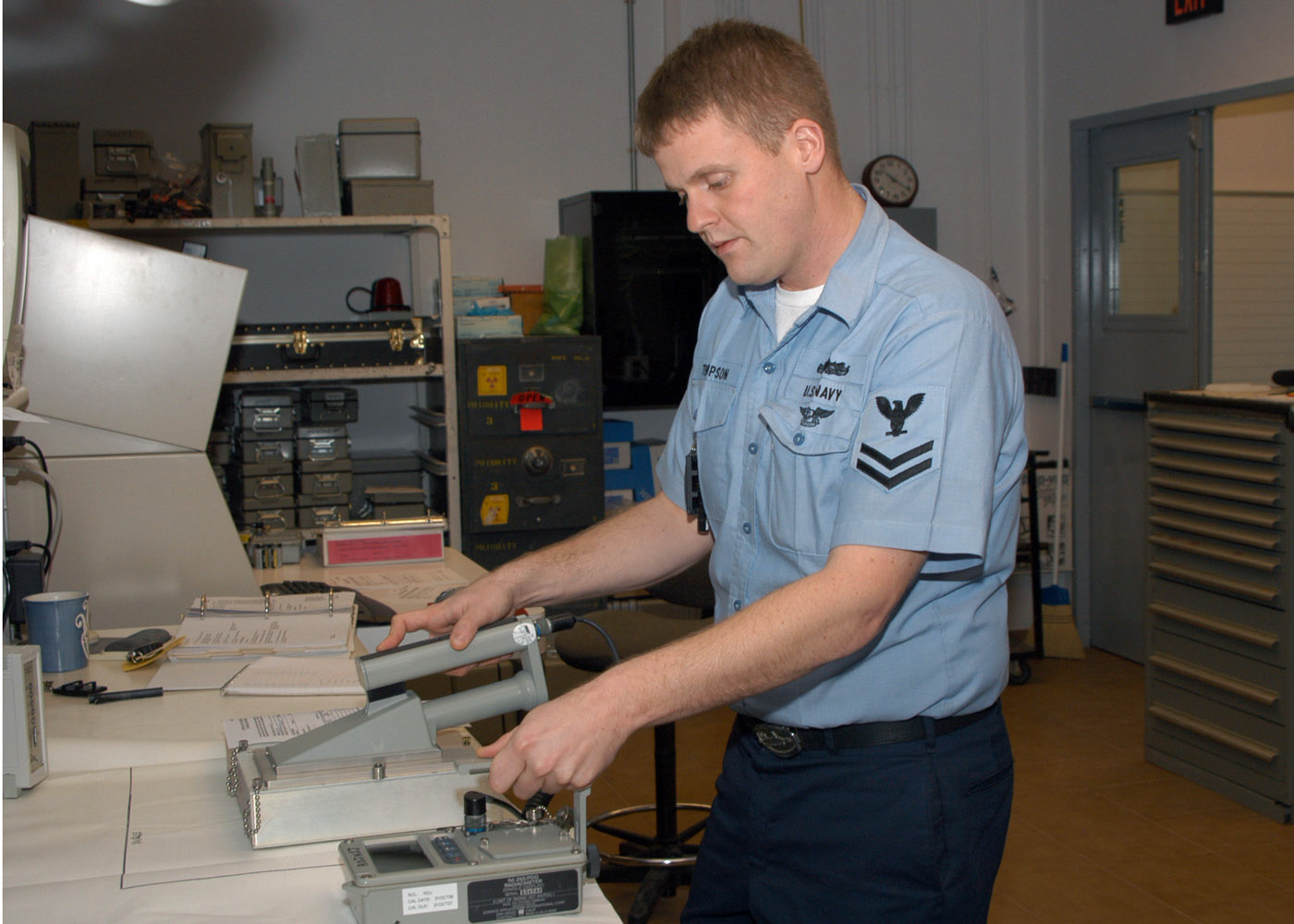
Hand-held large area alpha scintillation probe under calibration with a plate source in a bench calibration jig.

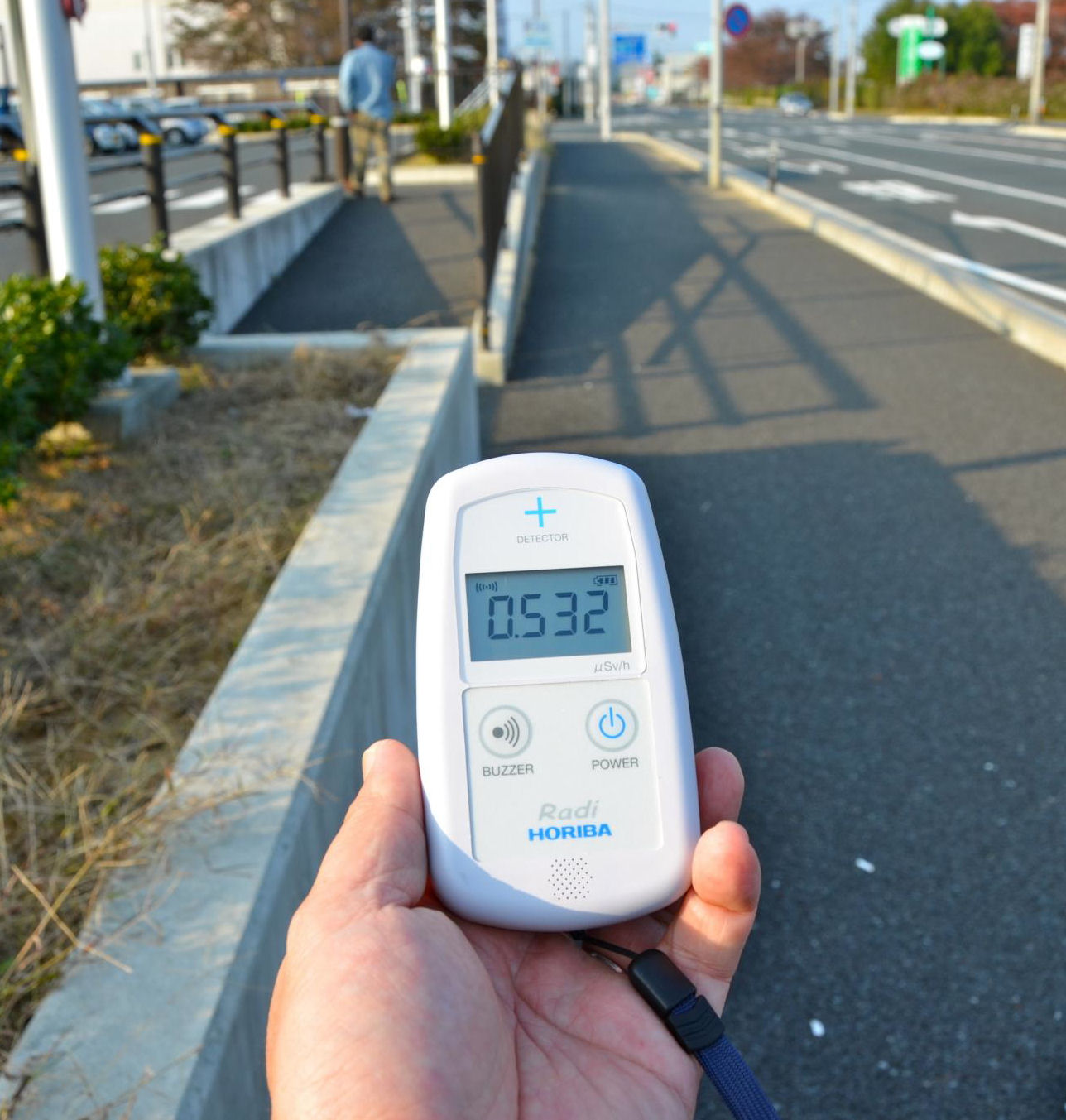
Hand-held scintillation counter reading ambient gamma dose. The position of the internal detector is shown by the cross

Radioactive contamination monitors, for area or personal surveys require a large detection area to ensure efficient and rapid coverage of monitored surfaces. For this a thin scintillator with a large area window and an integrated photomultiplier tube is ideally suited. They find wide application in the field of radioactive contamination monitoring of personnel and the environment. Detectors are designed to have one or two scintillation materials, depending on the application. "Single phosphor" detectors are used for either alpha or beta, and "Dual phosphor" detectors are used to detect both.

A scintillator such as zinc sulphide is used for alpha particle detection, whilst plastic scintillators are used for beta detection. The resultant scintillation energies can be discriminated so that alpha and beta counts can be measured separately with the same detector, This technique is used in both hand-held and fixed monitoring equipment, and such instruments are relatively inexpensive compared with the gas proportional detector.

=== Gamma ===
Scintillation materials are used for ambient gamma dose measurement, though a different construction is used to detect contamination, as no thin window is required.

== As a spectrometer ==
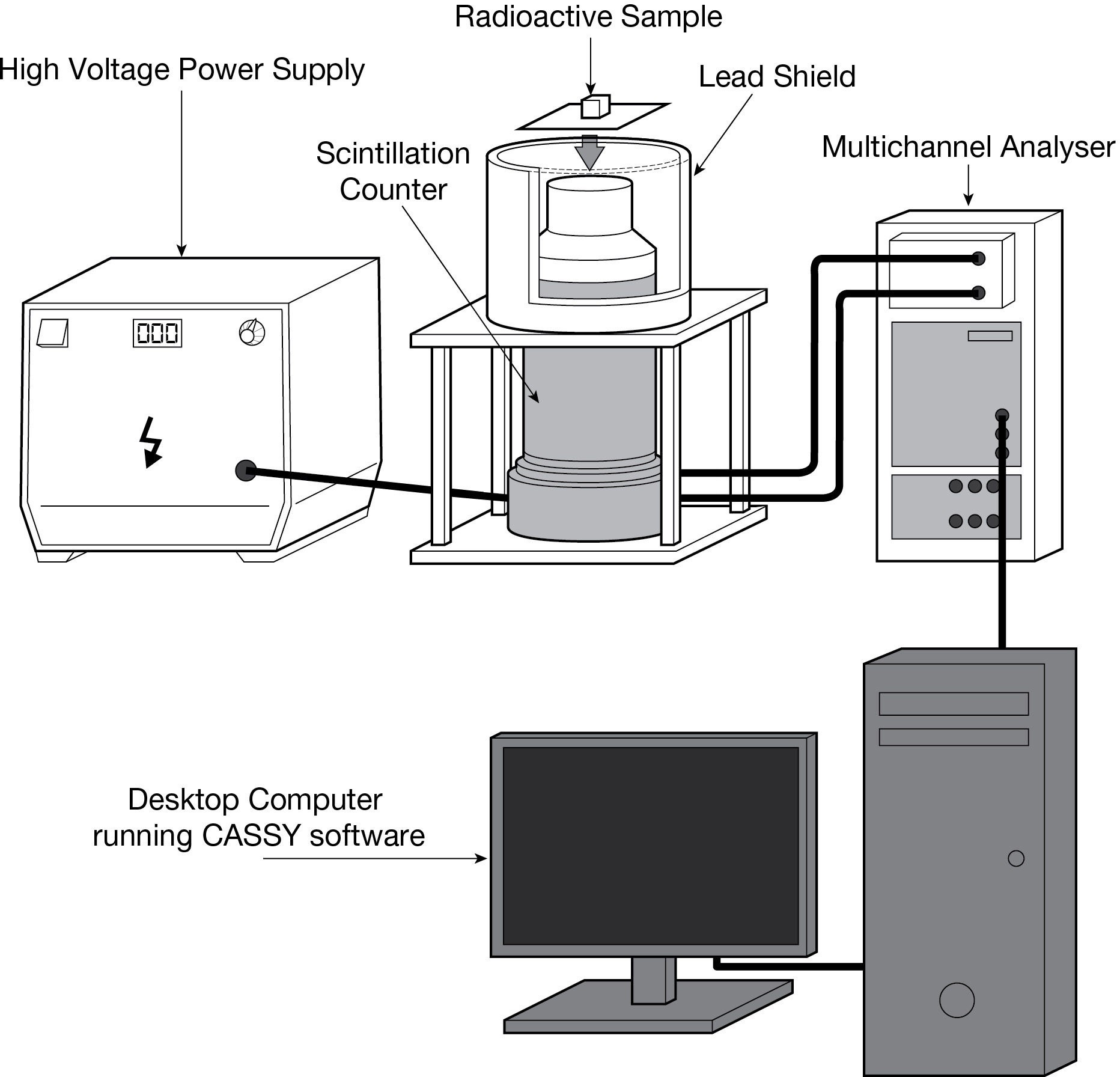
Measurement of gamma ray spectrum with a scintillation counter. A high voltage drives the counter which feeds signals to the Multichannel Analyser (MCA) and computer.

Scintillators often convert a single photon of high energy radiation into a high number of lower-energy photons, where the number of photons per megaelectronvolt of input energy is fairly constant. By measuring the intensity of the flash (the number of the photons produced by the x-ray or gamma photon) it is therefore possible to discern the original photon's energy.

The spectrometer consists of a suitable scintillator crystal, a photomultiplier tube, and a circuit for measuring the height of the pulses produced by the photomultiplier. The pulses are counted and sorted by their height, producing a x-y plot of scintillator flash brightness vs number of the flashes, which approximates the energy spectrum of the incident radiation, with some additional artifacts. A monochromatic gamma radiation produces a photopeak at its energy. The detector also shows response at the lower energies, caused by Compton scattering, two smaller escape peaks at energies 0.511 and 1.022 MeV below the photopeak for the creation of electron-positron pairs when one or both annihilation photons escape, and a backscatter peak. Higher energies can be measured when two or more photons strike the detector almost simultaneously (pile-up, within the time resolution of the data acquisition chain), appearing as sum peaks with energies up to the value of two or more photopeaks added

== See also ==
- Gamma spectroscopy
- Geiger counter
- Liquid scintillation counting
- Lucas cell
- Pandemonium effect
- Photon counting
- Scintigraphy
- Total absorption spectroscopy
