= Insight Dialogue =

Interpersonal meditation practice

Insight Dialogue is an interpersonal meditation practice that brings together meditative awareness (e.g., mindfulness, concentration), the wisdom teachings of the Buddha, and dialogue to support insight into the nature, causes, and release of human suffering. Six meditation instructions, or guidelines, form the core of the practice.

== Rationale ==
Insight Dialogue (ID) is an interpersonal co-meditation practice, where speaking and listening are introduced as meditative practices to facilitate mindfulness through and within the relational field. It was developed by Gregory Kramer and described in his book Insight Dialogue. The practice of ID aims to develop mindfulness and other meditative qualities (such as investigation, tranquility, and concentration) in the midst of interpersonal interaction, and to generate insight through mediative dialogue.

== Practices ==
The scaffolding for Insight Dialogue is provided by six meditation instructions: Pause; Relax; Open; Attune to Emergence; Listen Deeply; Speak the Truth.

“Each guideline calls forth different qualities, and all of them are complementary. In brief, Pause calls forth mindfulness; Relax, tranquility and acceptance; Open, relational availability and spaciousness; Trust Emergence, flexibility and letting go; Listen Deeply, receptivity and attunement; and Speak the Truth, integrity and care.”

In a January 2019 blog post, Gregory Kramer suggested the new wording "Attune to emergence" for the fourth guideline. The website of the Insight Dialogue Community was using this wording late 2024.

Those practising ID meditate in dyads (or groups), using these guidelines to support meditation in dialogue, and the meditators are provided with a contemplation topic or question that is designed not only to provide a focus for their speaking and listening, but also to help them explore fundamental aspects of being human and being in relationship with other human beings.

In his book, Kramer (2007) explicitly posits Insight Dialogue as a Buddhist Dharma practice, namely an interpersonal form of insight meditation or vipassana, with the discourse on the four foundations of mindfulness, the Satipatthana Sutta, as its central teaching. “Those four foundations are also foundations for Insight Dialogue: the body, feelings, mental states, and phenomena.” Moreover, Kramer asserts that each of the guidelines have their origins in traditional practices, e.g. mindfulness or sati for Pause; calm concentration or samadhi for Relax; and lovingkindness or metta for Open.
