= Counting efficiency =

In the measurement of ionising radiation the counting efficiency is the ratio between the number of particles or photons counted with a radiation counter and the number of particles or photons of the same type and energy emitted by the radiation source.

== Factors ==
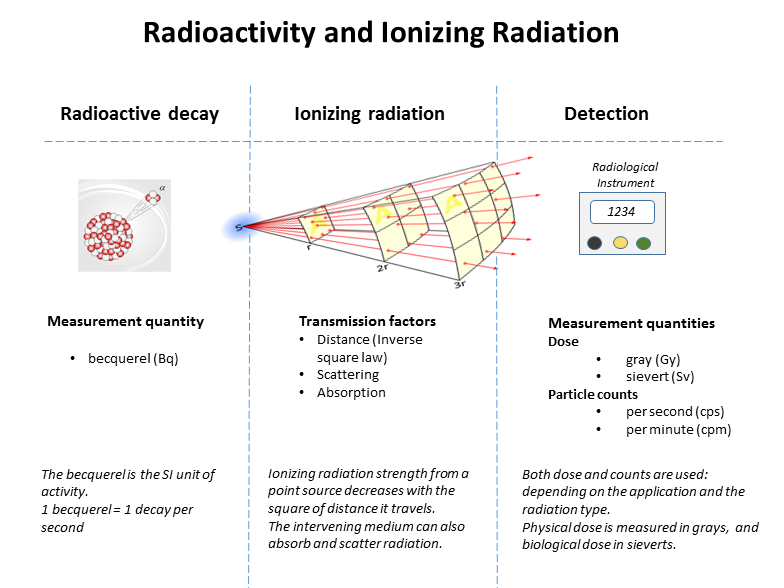
Graphic showing relationships between radioactivity and detected ionizing radiation

Several factors affect the counting efficiency:

- The distance from the source of radiation
- The absorption or scattering of particles by the medium (such as air) between the source and the surface of the detector
- The detector efficiency in counting all radiation photons and particles that reach the surface of the detector

The accompanying diagram shows this graphically.

== Scintillation counters ==
=== Radiation protection instruments ===
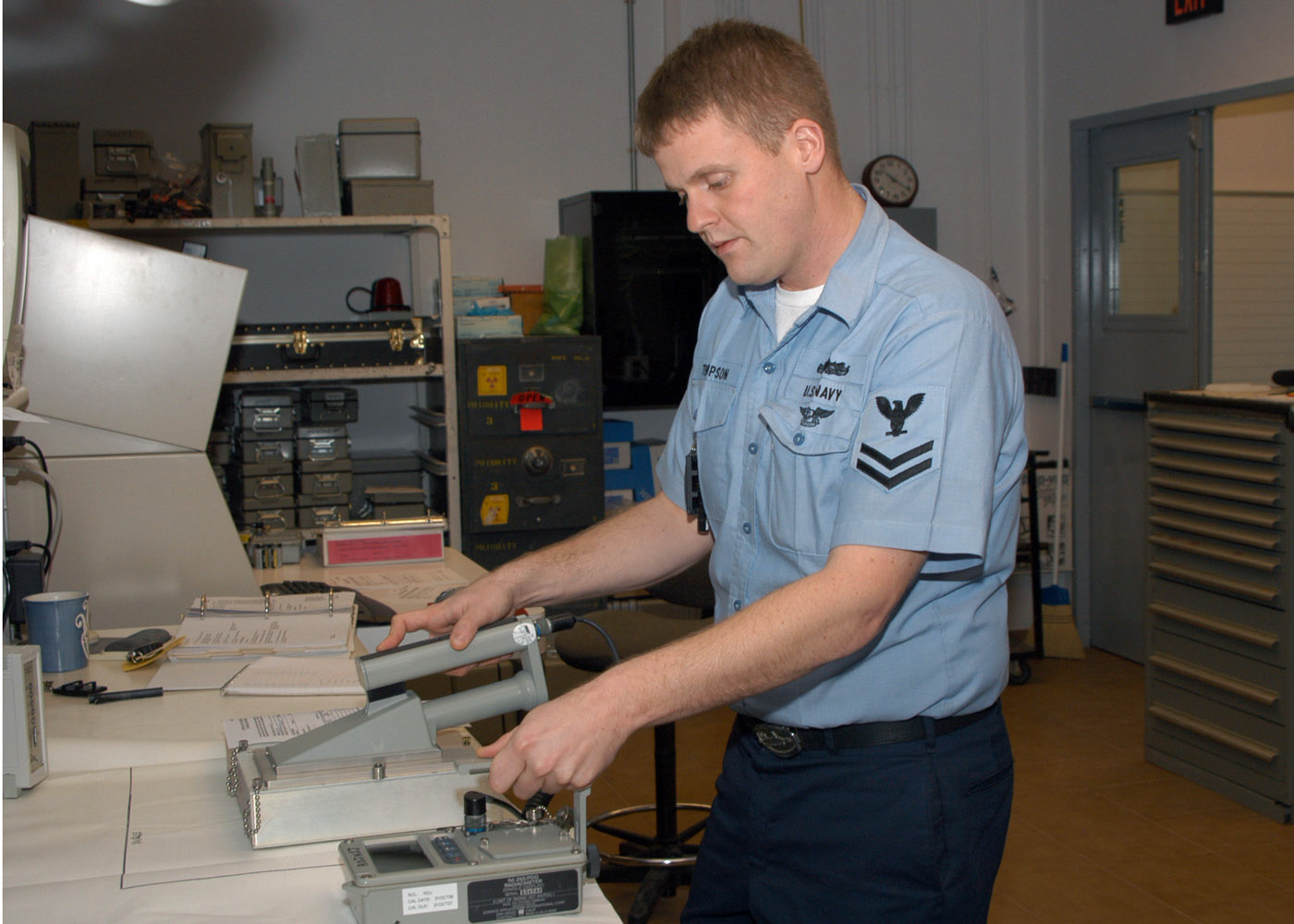
Hand-held large area alpha scintillation probe under calibration using a plate source in close proximity to the detector.

Large area scintillation counters used for surface radioactive contamination measurements use plate or planar radioactive sources as calibration standards. The Surface Emission Rate (SER), not the source activity, is used as a measure of the rate of particles emitted from the source of radiation. The SER is the true emission rate from the surface, which is usually different to the activity. This difference is due to self-shielding within the active layer of the source which will reduce the SER, or backscatter which will reflect particles off the backing plate of the active layer and will increase the SER. Beta particle plate sources usually have a significant backscatter, whereas alpha plate sources usually have no backscatter, but are easily self-attenuated if the active layer is made too thick.

=== Liquid scintillation counters ===
Counting efficiency varies for different isotopes, sample compositions and scintillation counters. Poor counting efficiency can be caused by an extremely low energy to light conversion rate, (scintillation efficiency) which, even optimally, will be a small value. It has been calculated that only some 4% of the energy from a β emission event is converted to light by even the most efficient scintillation cocktails.

== Gaseous counters ==
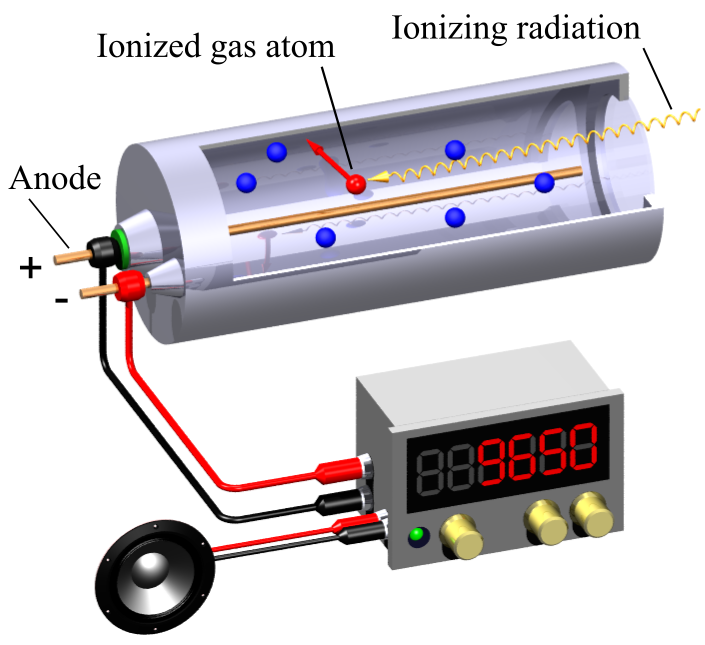
Schematic of a Geiger counter using an "end window" tube for low penetration radiation. A loudspeaker is also used for indication.

Proportional counters and end-window Geiger-Muller tubes have a very high efficiency for all ionising particles that reach the fill gas. Nearly every initial ionising event in the gas will result in Townsend avalanches, and thereby an output signal. However the overall detector efficiency is largely affected by attenuation due to the window or tube body through which particles have to pass.

In the case of gamma photons the detection efficiency is more dependent upon the fill gas and gamma energy. Low energy photons will interact more with the fill gas than high energy photons.

== See also ==
- Quantum efficiency

SI photon units
Quantity		Unit		Dimension	Notes
Name	Symbol (Note: Standards organizations recommend that photon quantities be denoted with a suffix "q" (for "quantum") to avoid confusion with radiometric and photometric quantities.)	Name	Symbol	Dimension	Notes
photon energy	n			1	count of photons n with energy Q_{p} = hc/λ. (Note: The energy of a single photon at wavelength λ is Q_{p} = hc/λ with h = Planck constant and c = velocity of light.)
photon flux	Φ_{q}	count per second	s^{−1}	T^{−1}	photons per unit time, dn/dt with n = photon number. also called photon power
photon intensity	I	count per steradian per second	sr^{−1}⋅s^{−1}	T^{−1}	dn/dω
photon radiance	L_{q}	count per square metre per steradian per second	m^{−2}⋅sr^{−1}⋅s^{−1}	L^{−2}T^{−1}	d^{2}n/(dA cos(θ) dω)
photon irradiance	E_{q}	count per square metre per second	m^{−2}⋅s^{−1}	L^{−2}T^{−1}	dn/dA
photon exitance	M	count per square metre per second	m^{−2}⋅s^{−1}	L^{−2}T^{−1}	dn/dA
See also: Photon counting; SI; Radiometry; Photometry
