= Liquid scintillation counting =

Measurement of radioactivity of a sample material

Liquid scintillation counting is the measurement of radioactive activity of a sample material which uses the technique of mixing the active material with a liquid scintillator cocktail, and counting the resultant photon emissions. The purpose is to allow more efficient counting due to the intimate contact of the activity with the scintillator. It is generally used for alpha particle or beta particle detection.

== Technique ==
Liquid scintillation counter

Samples are dissolved or suspended in a "cocktail" containing a solvent (historically aromatic organics such as xylene or toluene, but more recently less hazardous solvents are used), typically some form of a surfactant, and "fluors" or scintillators which produce the light measured by the detector. Scintillators can be divided into primary and secondary phosphors, differing in their luminescence properties.

Beta particles emitted from the isotopic sample transfer energy to the solvent molecules: the π cloud of the aromatic ring absorbs the energy of the emitted particle. The energized solvent molecules typically transfer the captured energy back and forth with other solvent molecules until the energy is finally transferred to a primary scintillator. The primary phosphor will emit photons following absorption of the transferred energy. Because that light emission may be at a wavelength that does not allow efficient detection, many cocktails contain secondary phosphors that absorb the fluorescence energy of the primary phosphor and re-emit at a longer wavelength. Two widely used primary and secondary fluors are 2,5-diphenyloxazole (PPO) with an emission maximum of 380 nm and 1,4-bis-2-(5-phenyloxazolyl)benzene (POPOP) with an emission maximum of 420 nm.

The radioactive samples and cocktail are placed in small transparent or translucent (often glass or plastic) vials that are loaded into an instrument known as a liquid scintillation counter. Newer machines may use 96-well plates with individual filters in each well. Many counters have two photo multiplier tubes connected in a coincidence circuit. The coincidence circuit assures that genuine light pulses, which reach both photomultiplier tubes, are counted, while spurious pulses (due to line noise, for example), which would only affect one of the tubes, are ignored.

Counting efficiencies under ideal conditions range from about 30% for tritium (a low-energy beta emitter) to nearly 100% for phosphorus-32, a high-energy beta emitter. Some chemical compounds (notably chlorine compounds) and highly colored samples can interfere with the counting process. This interference, known as "quenching", can be overcome through data correction or through careful sample preparation.

== Cherenkov counting ==
High-energy beta emitters, such as phosphorus-32 and yttrium-90 can also be counted in a scintillation counter without the cocktail, instead using an aqueous solution containing no scintillators. This technique, known as Cherenkov counting, relies on Cherenkov radiation being detected directly by the photomultiplier tubes. Cherenkov counting benefits from the use of plastic vials which scatter the emitted light, increasing the potential for light to reach the photomultiplier tube.

== See also ==
- Accelerator mass spectrometry
- Counting efficiency
