= Gregory Kramer =

American composer, researcher, inventor, meditation teacher and author

Gregory Paul Kramer (born 14 October 1952, in Los Angeles, California), is an American composer, researcher, inventor, meditation teacher and author. In 1975 he co-founded Electronic Musicmobile, a pioneer synthesizer ensemble later renamed Electronic Art Ensemble, in which Kramer was a musician and composer. His pioneering work extended to developing synthesizer and related equipment. Kramer also co-founded the not-for-profit arts organization Harvestworks in New York City. He is recognized as the founding figure of the intensely cross-disciplinary field of data sonification. Since 1980, Kramer teaches Buddhist meditation. He is credited as developer of Insight Dialogue, an interpersonal meditation practice. Kramer is the author of several books in diverse fields, as well as (co-)author of scientific papers in the field of data sonification.

== Career ==
=== Musician/composer ===
From 1975, Kramer was a founding member of Electronic Musicmobile, an electronic music touring ensemble. Kramer and two other players performed using only synthesizers; Kramer was the musical director and primary composer. In 1979, the personnel stabilized and the group was renamed Electronic Art Ensemble. Its line-up included Stephen Horelick, Clive Smith and Russel Dorwart. From then on, the group also used instruments other than synthesizers, modifying their sounds electronically. The aims of Electronic Musicmobile, and later the Electronic Art Ensemble, were to explore a new timbral and gestural language for music, and to expose a wider portion of the population to electronic music. To this end, the ensemble toured the Northeastern part of the United States for 6 consecutive years. Performances featured music composed by Kramer and other members of the ensemble, as well as contemporary American composers such as John Cage and Christian Wolff. In 2022, the Electronic Art Ensemble reunited and is again actively composing and recording.

Kramer scored numerous films, video, and dance performances. He scored the Emmy Award winning Henry Hudson’s River: A Biography, and Metro: Manhattan Chowder by the same production company, which won the Cine Golden Eagle and other awards.

Kramer was an Assistant Professor of Composition in the Music Department of NYU, from 1975 to 1979. In 1976, Kramer co-founded the Public Access Synthesizer Studio (PASS) in New York City, where anyone could use various contemporary synthesizers for $3 per hour. The studio also hosted seminars and performances on synthesizers and electronic music and featured a design file and tape library.

In 1977, to support PASS and its various programs, Kramer co-founded Harvestworks, a not-for-profit arts organization located in New York City dedicated to providing access to the knowledge and tools of music technology through education programs, publications, artist assistance, and music and sound art presentation projects. He remains as the Chair Emeritus of Harvestworks.

=== Inventor ===
In 1973, Kramer founded and since managed Electron Farm, a company that built and sold Buchla 100 synthesizers and custom synthesizer modules in New York City. Through his company Clarity, founded in 1981, Kramer conceived and developed the MIDI XLV, and with it helped launch the recording technique of signal process automation. Through Clarity, Kramer also conceived of and designed the Lexicon MRC (MIDI Remote Control). This product was the first MIDI remote control and fader box, now a major product category in music technology. The MRC won the 1989 TEC Award for Technical Excellence (Ancillary Equipment). Kramer collaborated closely with Robert Moog, who since 1970 had been working on a keyboard controller that would respond to human touch. In 1993, Moog reduced his involvement in the project, stating that "I've given them to Eaton and to one other artist, Gregory Kramer, an experimental composer [...]". Moog continued working with Kramer until his death in 2005,< and Kramer continues to work on the project with a team of engineers.

=== Science ===
As a member of the Santa Fe Institute, Kramer organized the first International Conference on Auditory Display in 1992. He subsequently established and became the first president of the International Community for Auditory Display (ICAD), a non-profit corporation dedicated to supporting the development of auditory display research and community formation. Kramer edited the Proceedings, which was the first book on auditory display and data sonification and remains possibly the most oft-cited publication in the field.

=== Buddhist teacher ===
Kramer has been teaching meditation worldwide since 1980. He teaches vipassana meditation, dharma contemplation, and Insight Dialogue at retreats, and in universities worldwide. In 1995 he co-founded the Metta Foundation in Portland, Oregon, a non-profit corporation dedicated to supporting the growth and development of insight meditation and the teachings of the Buddha as they manifest in our current society, and for which he functions as a meditation teacher, author, and director. In 2020, the Metta Foundation supported the formation of the Insight Dialogue Community, in which Kramer remains involved as a Founding Teacher. His meditation practice since 1974 has included studies with a number of esteemed monastics, including Anagarika Dhammadinna, Ven. Balangoda Ananda Maitreya Mahanayaka Thero, Achan Sobin S. Namto and Ven. Punnaji Mahathera.

Kramer graduated from the California Institute of the Arts (BFA, Music Composition, 1972) and New York University (MA, Music Composition, 1977). He holds a Ph.D. in Learning and Change in Human Systems from the California Institute of Integral Studies. He is married and the father of three grown sons. He lives in Orcas, Washington where he remains focused on writing, training teachers, and living a contemplative life.

== Bibliography (selection) ==
- Kramer, Gregory (1994). Auditory Display: Sonification, Audification, and Auditory Interfaces. Santa Fe: CRC Press. ISBN 9780201626049.
- Kramer, Gregory (2011). Meditating Together, Speaking from Silence: the Practice of Insight Dialogue. Portland, OR: Metta Foundation.
- Kramer, Gregory (2007). Insight dialogue: the interpersonal path to freedom. Boston: Shambhala Publications. ISBN 9781590304853. OCLC 123284812.
- Kramer, Gregory (2020). A Whole-Life Path: A Lay Buddhist's Guide to Crafting a Dhamma-Infused Life. Boston: Insight Dialogue Community. ISBN 9780966672718.
- Kramer, Gregory (2011). Dharma Contemplation: meditating together with wisdom texts. Portland, OR: Metta Foundation.

== Discography ==
- Electronic Art Ensemble – Inquietude (1982). Gramavision – GR 7003
- Kramer-Angus Duo — KAD (2004). Dolce Sfogato
- Electronic Art Ensemble – Return (2024).
