= RadNet =

Company

- Type: Public
- Traded as: Nasdaq: RDNT; S&P 600 Component; Russell 2000 Component
- Industry: Medical care
- Founded: 1981; 45 years ago
- Founder: Howard Berger
- Headquarters: Los Angeles, United States, U.S.
- Area served: United States
- Key people: Dr. Howard Berger, Norman Hames, Stephen Forthuber
- Services: Medical care; Imaging
- Number of employees: 11,000+
- Subsidiaries: RadNet Management, Inc
- Website: radnet.com

RadNet is an American radiology firm. The company operates outpatient diagnostic imaging services. Headquartered in Los Angeles, California, RadNet is the largest operator of freestanding, fixed-site diagnostic imaging centers in the United States, based on the number of locations and annual imaging revenue. As of 2025, the company owns and/or operates over 400 imaging centers across Arizona, California, Delaware, Florida, Maryland, New Jersey, New York, and Texas.

== History ==
RadNet was founded in 1981 as a small imaging center in Los Angeles.

In 1992 the company was bought by Primedex Health Systems, a California-based management company that catered to small medical clinics. Many of the company's new initiatives were centered around diagnostic imaging services, which were managed by RadNet. By the end of the 1990s, RadNet had replaced Primedex as the parent company, with many of Primedex's assets being folded into subsidiaries of RadNet.

In the early 2000s RadNet acquired smaller radiology firms. The company repurchased its debt in 2005 and in 2006 worked with General Electric to secure a $450 million syndicated loan with which to continue its corporate acquisitions. 2006 also saw RadNet and Primedex split their stock, resulting in RadNet becoming the official parent company and Primedex becoming a subsidiary.

RadNet joined the S&P 600 in November 2019, replacing American newspaper provider Gannett Co.

== Operations ==
RadNet acquires smaller imaging centers. The company has also begun to open new outpatient centers to work with existing healthcare networks. RadNet acquired DeepHealth, a machine learning firm working to develop radiology artificial intelligence.
