= Walther Müller =

German physicist (1905–1979)

Walther Müller (6 September 1905, in Hanover – 4 December 1979, in Walnut Creek, California) was a German physicist, most well known for his improvement of Hans Geiger's counter for ionizing radiation, now known as the Geiger–Müller tube.

Walther Müller studied physics, chemistry and philosophy at the University of Kiel. In 1925 he became the first PhD student of Hans Geiger, who had just got a professorship in Kiel. Their work on ionization of gases by collision lead to the invention of the Geiger–Müller counter, a now indispensable tool for measuring radioactive radiation.

After some time as professor at the University of Tübingen he worked for the rest of his professional life as industrial physicist (i.e., a physicist working in industrial R&D) in Germany, then as an advisor for the Australian Postmaster-General's Department Research Laboratories in Melbourne, and then as an industrial physicist in the United States, where he also founded a company to manufacture Geiger–Müller tubes. He died in 1979 in California.
