= Pileup (disambiguation) =

A pileup can refer to:

- Multiple-vehicle collision
- In nuclear and particle physics, a situation where a particle detector is affected by several events at the same time.
- In ham radio, particularly in DXing slang, the presence of many ham operators trying to communicate with a distant entity, all in the same time.
- Pile Up, an album by queercore band Pansy Division
- Pileup format, a file format used in the field of Bioinformatics
