= Oliver Scott =

English radiobiologist (1922–2016)

Sir Oliver Scott MRCS LRCP FRCR
- Oliver Scott
- Born: Oliver Christopher Anderson Scott; 6 November 1922
- Died: 4 November 2016 (aged 93)
- Education: Charterhouse School; King's College, Cambridge; St Thomas' Hospital
- Known for: Oxygen effect
- Spouse: Phoebe-Anne Tolhurst
- Children: Christopher, Hermione and Camilla
- Parents: Samuel Haslam Scott (father); Nancy Anderson (mother)
- Awards: Honorary Fellowship in the British Institute of Radiology
- Scientific career
- Fields: Radiobiology
- Workplaces: Provincial Insurance Company; Hammersmith Hospital; Gray Laboratory; Royal Society of Medicine; President of the Royal Society of Medicine (Oncology)

Sir Oliver Christopher Anderson Scott FRCR, MRCS, MB BChir, LRCP, 3rd Baronet Scott Of Yews (6 November 1922 – 4 November 2016) was a radiobiologist and philanthropist who worked with LH Gray and on Gray's death became the second director of the Gray Laboratory.

He became in line for the 3rd Baronet Scott on the death of his brother, James Philip Edmund Scott (born 13 August 1915, died in Libya 31 May 1942)

In 1991 the main building of the Cancer Research Campaign Gray Laboratory was named the Oliver Scott Building.

== Education ==
Educated at Charterhouse School, Oliver read natural sciences at King's College Cambridge, joined the MRCS and MB BChir 1946 University of Cambridge, LRCP and qualified as a radiologist at St Thomas's Hospital in 1946.

== Career ==
- HMS Dolphin (1947 - 1949)
- Director of the Provincial Insurance Company (1955 - 1964)
- Director of Gray Lab (1965 - 1969),
- President of the oncology section of the Royal Society of Medicine (1987–88)

== Research ==
Oliver Scott was best known for his research on the oxygen effect in radiotherapy.

Oliver Scott provided anonymous funding to the British Empire Cancer Campaign to establish a Radiobiological Research Laboratory with Hal Gray as the first director.
