= Sir Samuel Scott, 2nd Baronet =

Sir Samuel Scott, 2nd Baronet may refer to:

- Sir Samuel Scott, 2nd Baronet of Lytchet Minster (1772–1849), Member of Parliament for Malmesbury, Camelford and Whitchurch
- Sir Samuel Haslam Scott, 2nd Baronet of Yews (1875–1960), businessman and author
