= Louis Harold Gray =

English physicist (1905–1965)

- LH Gray (left) and J Boag supervising construction of the Gray Laboratory at Mount Vernon Hospital in north London.
- Born: 10 November 1905; Richmond upon Thames, England
- Died: 9 July 1965 (aged 59); Northwood, London
- Education: The Latymer School; Christ's Hospital; Trinity College, Cambridge
- Known for: Bragg–Gray cavity theory Gray (unit)
- Spouse: Frieda Marjorie Picot
- Parents: Harry Gray (father); Amy Bowen (mother)
- Awards: Roentgen Award; Sylvanus Thompson Medal; Barclay Medal; Katherine Berkan Judd Award; Bertner Foundation Award; Fellow of the Royal Society
- Scientific career
- Institutions: Cavendish Laboratory; Fellow of Trinity College; Medical Research Council's Radiotherapeutic Research Unit at Hammersmith Hospital
- Thesis: (1930)
- Doctoral advisor: James Chadwick
- Author abbrev. (botany)

Louis Harold Gray FRS (10 November 1905 – 9 July 1965) was an English physicist who worked mainly on the effects of radiation on biological systems. He was one of the earliest contributors of the field of radiobiology. Amongst many other achievements, he defined a unit of radiation dosage (absorbed dose) which was later named after him as an SI unit, the gray.

== Early life ==
Gray was born as an only child on 10 November 1905 to parents Harry and Amy Gray. His father worked at a post office.

== Career ==
- 1933 – Hospital physicist at Mount Vernon Hospital, London
- 1936 – Developed the Bragg–Gray equation, the basis for the cavity ionization method of measuring gamma-ray energy absorption by materials
- 1937 – Built an early neutron generator at Mount Vernon Hospital
- 1938 – Studied biological effects of neutrons using the generator
- 1940 – Developed concept of RBE (Relative Biological Effectiveness) of doses of neutrons
- 1952 – Initiated research into cells in hypoxic tumors and hyperbaric oxygen
- 1953 – Oliver Scott established the British Empire Cancer Campaign Research Unit in Radiobiology at Mount Vernon Hospital with Hal Gray as director which in 1970 became the Cancer Research Campaign's Gray Laboratory and then (in 2001) the Gray Cancer Institute.
- 1953–1960 – Under Gray's direction, Jack W. Boag developed pulse radiolysis
- 1962 – Ed Hart, of Argonne National Laboratory, and Jack Boag discovered the hydrated electron using pulse radiolysis at the Gray Laboratory – this discovery initiated a new direction of research that is still very active today and is vital for understanding the effects of radiation on biological tissue, for instance in cancer treatment.
