= Ionization chamber =

Gas-filled radiation detector

The ionization chamber is the simplest type of gaseous ionization detector, and is widely used for the detection and measurement of many types of ionizing radiation, including X-rays, gamma rays, alpha particles and beta particles. Conventionally, the term "ionization chamber" refers exclusively to those detectors which collect all the charges created by direct ionization within the gas through the application of an electric field. It uses the discrete charges created by each interaction between the incident radiation and the gas to produce an output in the form of a small direct current. This means individual ionising events cannot be measured, so the energy of different types of radiation cannot be differentiated, but it gives a very good measurement of overall ionising effect.

It has a good uniform response to radiation over a wide range of energies and is the preferred means of measuring high levels of gamma radiation, such as in a radiation hot cell as they can tolerate prolonged periods in high radiation fields without degradation. They are widely used in the nuclear power industry, research labs, fire detection, radiation protection, and environmental monitoring.

== Principle of operation ==
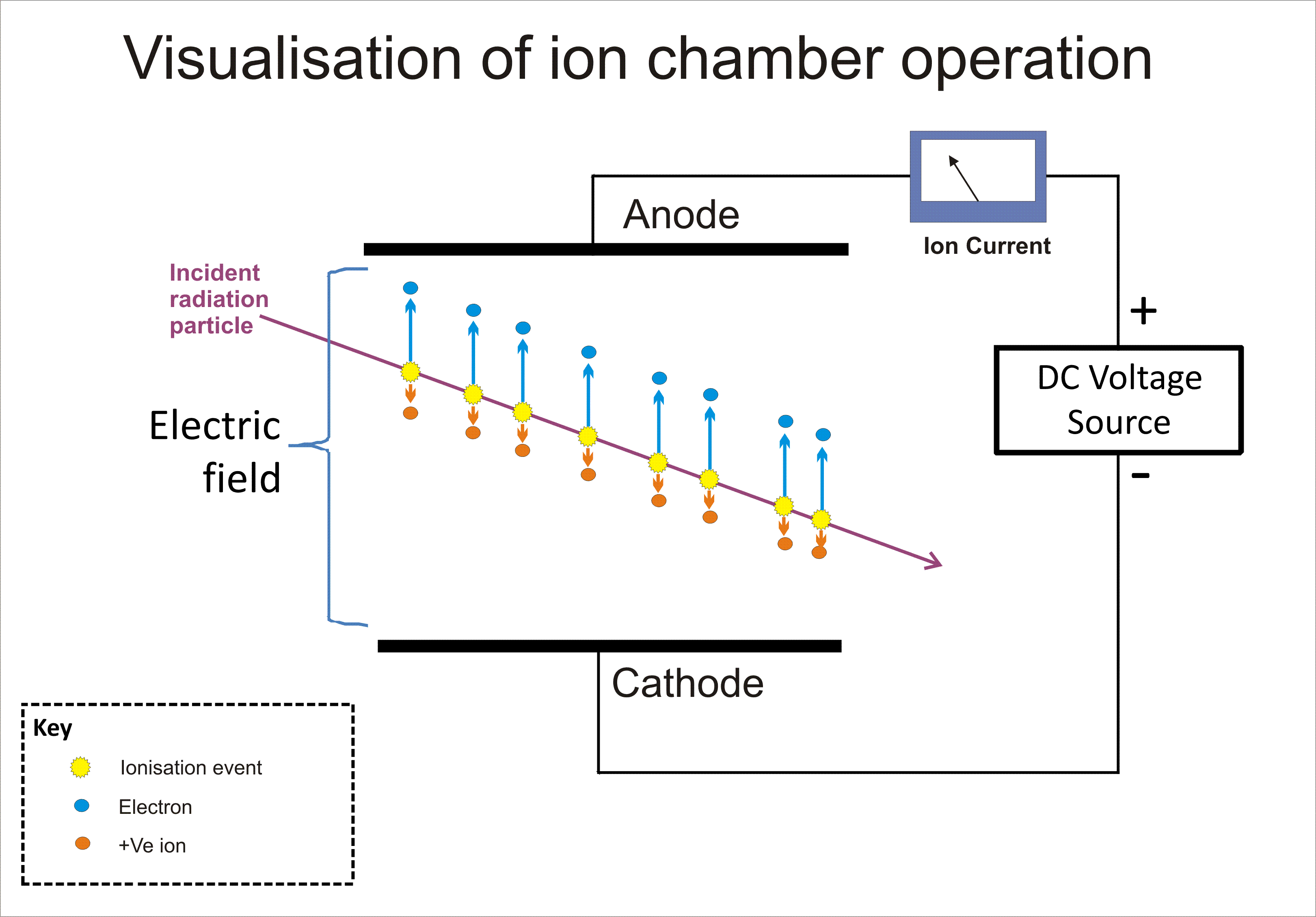
Schematic diagram of a parallel plate ion chamber, showing creation of ion pairs, and drift of ions due to electric field. Electrons typically drift 1000 times faster than positive ions due to their smaller mass.

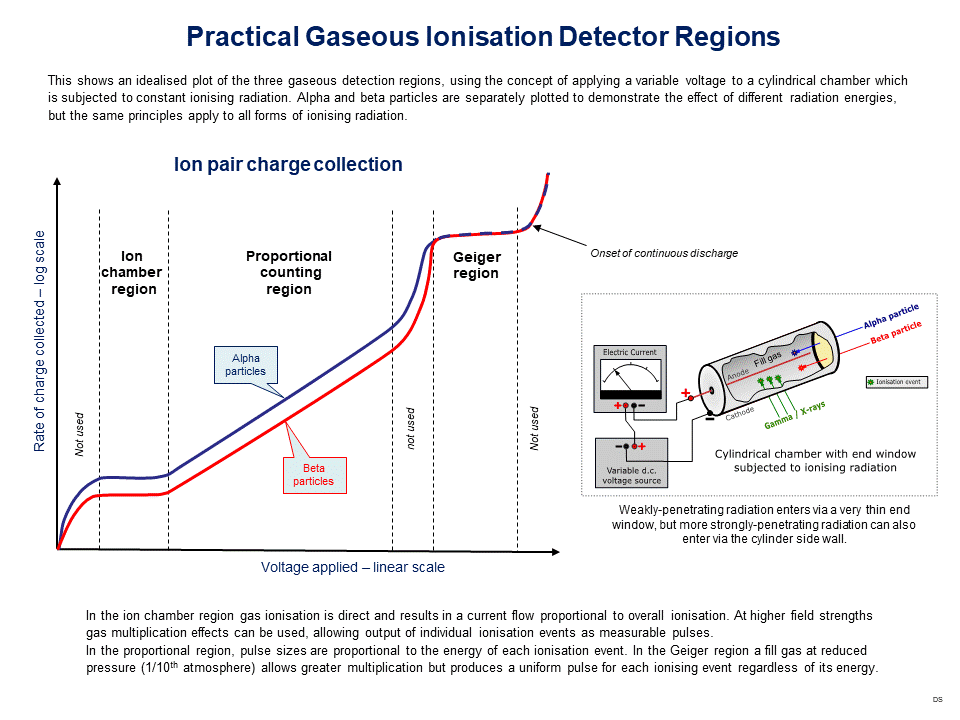
Plot of ion current against voltage for a conceptual wire cylinder gaseous radiation detector. Ion chambers use the lowest voltage plateau.

A gas ionization chamber measures the charge from ion pairs created within a gas caused by incident radiation. It consists of a gas-filled chamber with two electrodes; known as anode and cathode. The electrodes may be in the form of parallel plates (Parallel Plate Ionization Chambers: PPIC), or a cylinder with a coaxially located internal anode wire.

A voltage potential is applied between the electrodes to create an electric field in the fill gas. When gas atoms or molecules between the electrodes are ionized by incident ionizing radiation, ion-pairs are created and the resultant positive ions and dissociated electrons move to the electrodes of the opposite polarity under the influence of the electric field. This generates an ionization current which is measured by an electrometer circuit in the region of femtoamperes to picoamperes, depending on the chamber design, and is proportional to the radiation dose.

The electric field has to be sufficiently strong to prevent the recombination of ion pairs which would diminish the ion current, and build-up of positive ions is prevented by their recombination with electrons when they reach the cathode. This mode of operation is referred to as "current" mode, meaning that the output signal is a continuous current, and not a pulse output as in the cases of the Geiger–Müller tube or the proportional counter.

Referring to the accompanying ion-pair collection graph, it can be seen that in the ion chamber operating region the charge of a collected ion pair is effectively constant over a range of applied voltage, as due to its relatively low electric field strength the ion chamber does not have any multiplication effect. This is in distinction to the Geiger–Müller tube or the proportional counter whereby secondary electrons, and ultimately multiple avalanches, greatly amplify the original ionisation charges to produce measurable pulses.

== Chamber types and construction ==
The following chamber types are commonly used.

=== Free-air chamber ===
This is a chamber freely open to atmosphere, where the fill gas is ambient air. The domestic smoke detector is a good example of this, where a natural flow of air through the chamber is necessary so that smoke particles can be detected by the change in ion current. Other examples are applications where the ions are created outside the chamber but are carried in by a forced flow of air or gas.

==== Vented chamber ====
These chambers are normally cylindrical and operate at atmospheric pressure, but to prevent ingress of moisture a filter containing a desiccant is installed in the vent line. This is to stop moisture building up in the interior of the chamber, which would otherwise be introduced by the "pump" effect of changing atmospheric air pressure. These chambers have a cylindrical body made of aluminium or plastic a few millimetres thick. The material is selected to have an atomic number similar to that of air so that the wall is said to be "air equivalent" over a range of radiation beam energies. This has the effect of ensuring the gas in the chamber is acting as though it were a portion of an infinitely large gas volume, and increases the accuracy by reducing interactions of gamma with the wall material. The higher the atomic number of the wall material, the greater the chance of interaction. The wall thickness is a trade-off between maintaining the air effect with a thicker wall, and increasing sensitivity by using a thinner wall. These chambers often have an end window made of material thin enough, such as mylar, so that beta particles can enter the gas volume. Gamma radiation enters both through the end window and the side walls. For hand-held instruments the wall thickness is made as uniform as possible to reduce photon directionality though any beta window response is obviously highly directional. Vented chambers are susceptible to small changes in efficiency with air pressure and correction factors can be applied for very accurate measurement applications.

==== Sealed low-pressure chamber ====
These are similar in construction to the vented chamber, but are sealed and operate at or around atmospheric pressure. These chambers also have the advantage of not requiring a vent and desiccant. To improve detection efficiency, they are filled with a noble gas because the highly electronegative oxygen in air easily captures free electrons, forming negative ions. The strength of the beta window limits the differential pressure from atmospheric pressure that can be tolerated, and common materials are stainless steel or titanium with a typical thickness of 25 μm.

==== High-pressure chamber ====
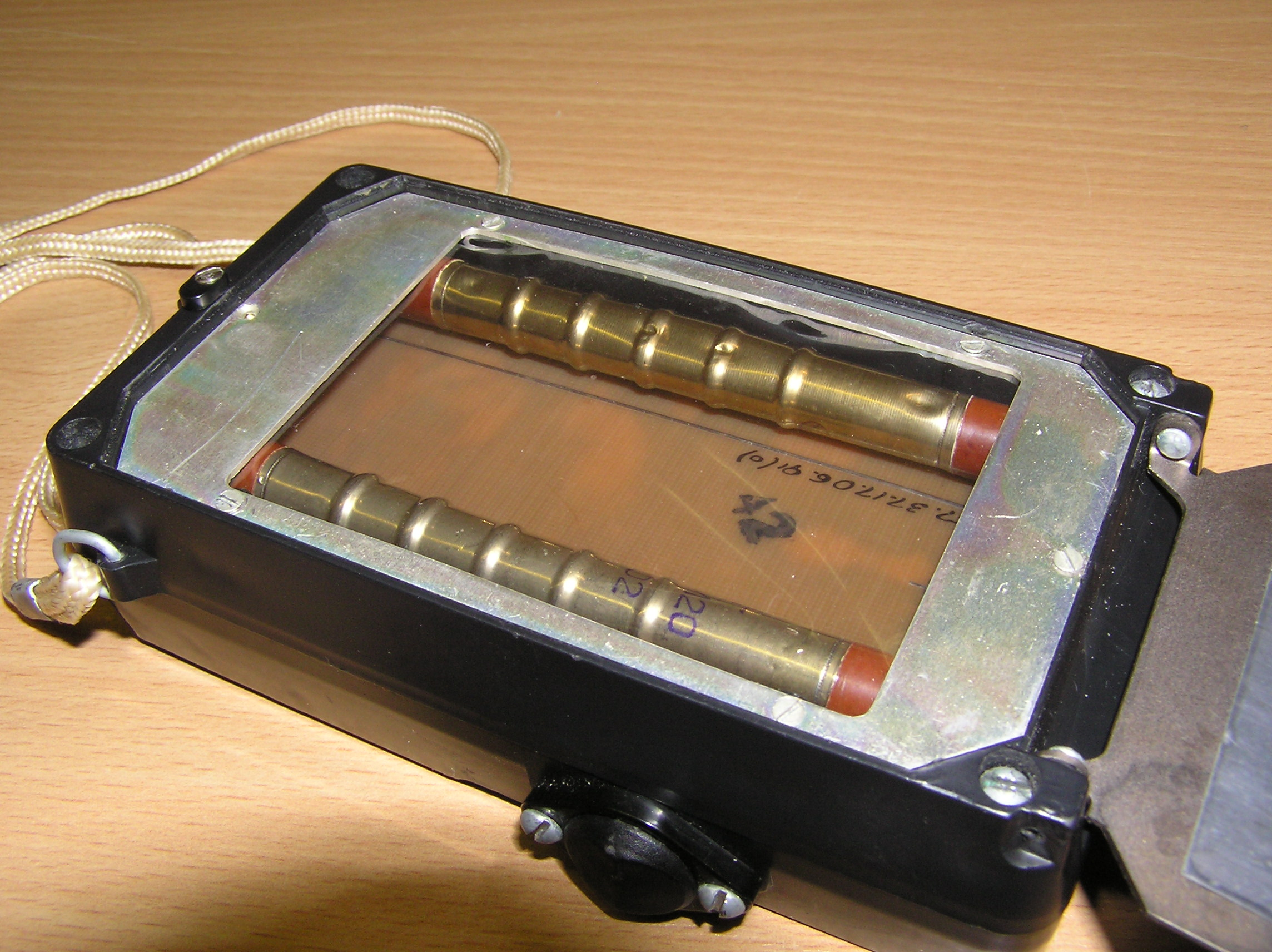
Two high pressure cylindrical ion chambers in an enclosure.

The efficiency of the chamber can be further increased by the use of a high-pressure gas. Typically a pressure of 8-10 atmospheres can be used, and various noble gases are employed. The higher pressure results in a greater gas density and thereby a greater chance of collision with the fill gas and ion-pair creation by incident radiation. Because of the increased wall thickness required to withstand this high pressure, only gamma radiation can be detected. These detectors are used in survey meters and for environmental monitoring.

=== Chamber geometry ===
Most commonly used for radiation therapy measurements is a cylindrical or "thimble" chamber. The active volume is housed within a thimble shaped cavity with an inner conductive surface (cathode) and a central anode. A bias voltage applied across the cavity collects ions and produces a current which can be measured with an electrometer.

Parallel-plate chambers (PPIC) are shaped like a small disc, with circular collecting electrodes separated by a small gap, typically 2mm or less. The upper disc is extremely thin, allowing for much more accurate near-surface dose measurements than are possible with a cylindrical chamber. Monitor chambers are typically PPICs which are used to continuously measure such as a radiation beam's intensity. For example, within the head of linear accelerators used for radiotherapy. Multi-cavity ionization chambers can measure the intensity of the radiation beam in several different regions, providing beam symmetry and flatness information.

=== Research and calibration chambers ===
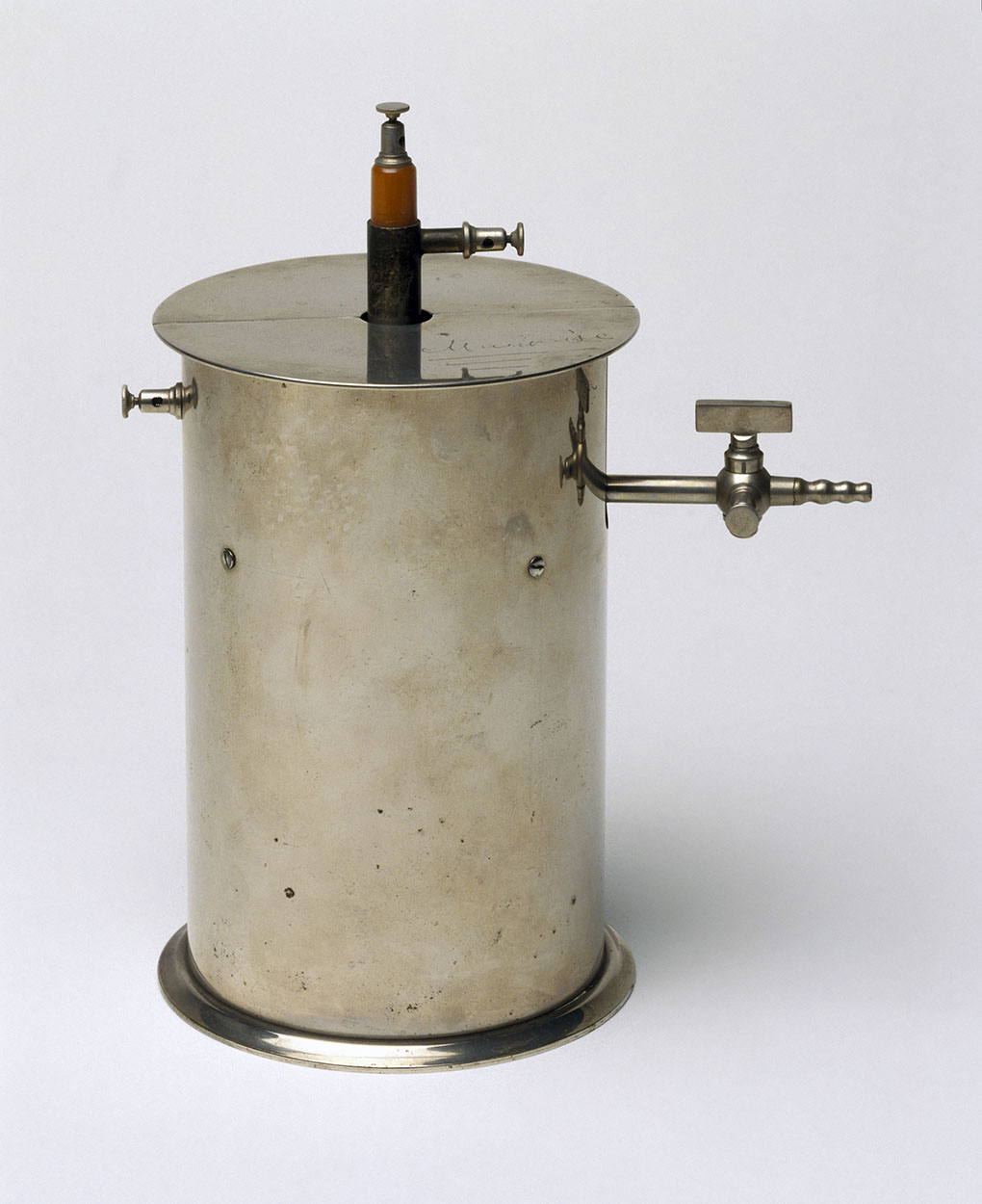
Ionization chamber made by Pierre Curie, c 1895-1900

Early versions of the ion chamber were used by Marie and Pierre Curie in their original work in isolating radioactive materials. Since then the ion chamber has been a widely used tool in the laboratory for research and calibration purposes.

=== Historical chambers ===
==== Condenser chamber ====
The condenser chamber has a secondary cavity within the stem which acts as a capacitor. When this capacitor is fully charged, any ionization within the thimble counteracts this charge, and the change in charge can be measured. They are only practical for beams with energy of 2 MeV or less, and high stem leakage makes them unsuited to precise dosimetry.

==== Extrapolation chamber ====
Similar in design to a parallel plate chamber, the upper plate of an extrapolation chamber can be lowered using micrometer screws. Measurements can be taken with different plate spacing and extrapolated to a plate spacing of zero, i.e. the dose without the chamber.

== Instrument types ==
=== Hand-held ===
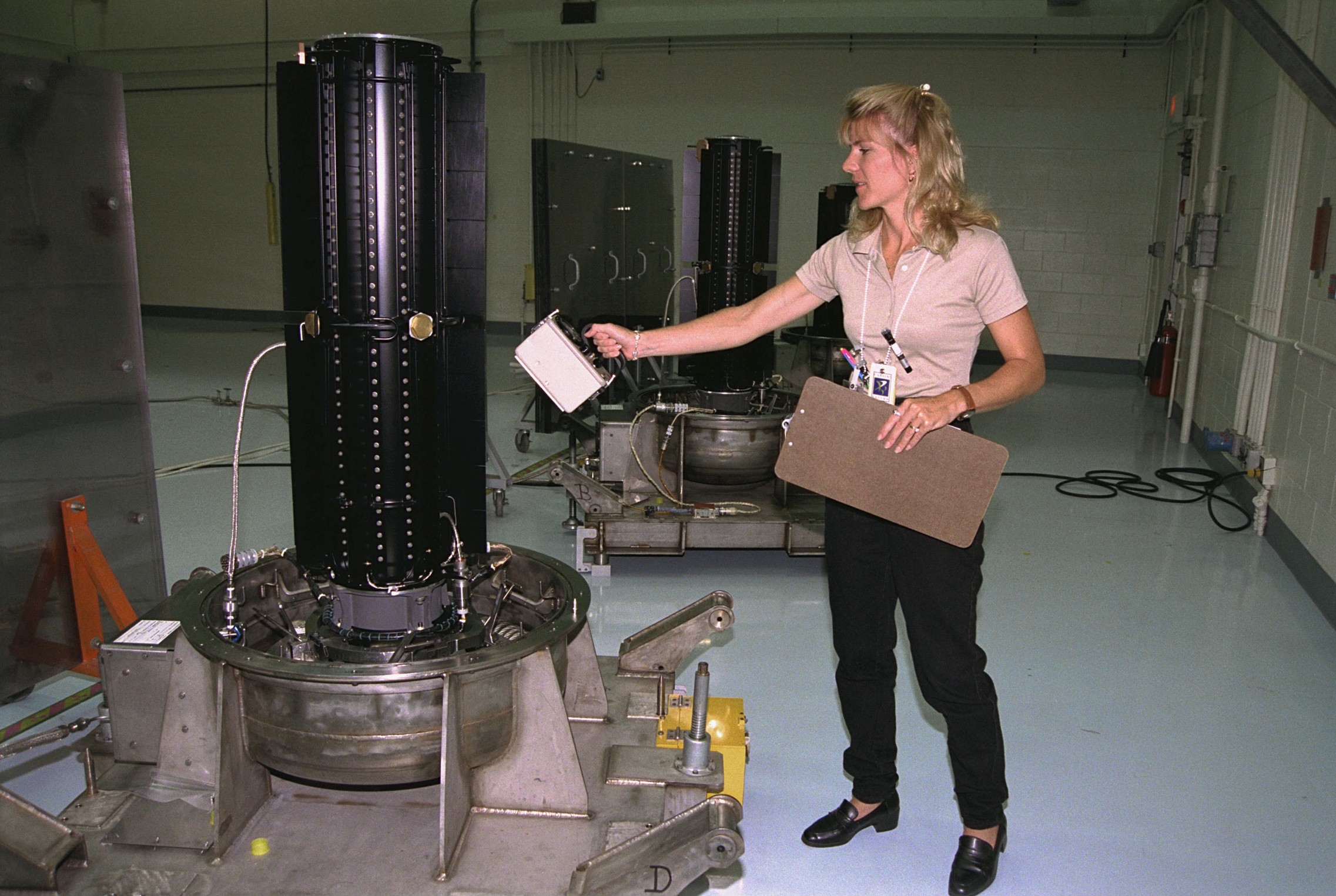
Hand-held integral ion chamber survey meter in use

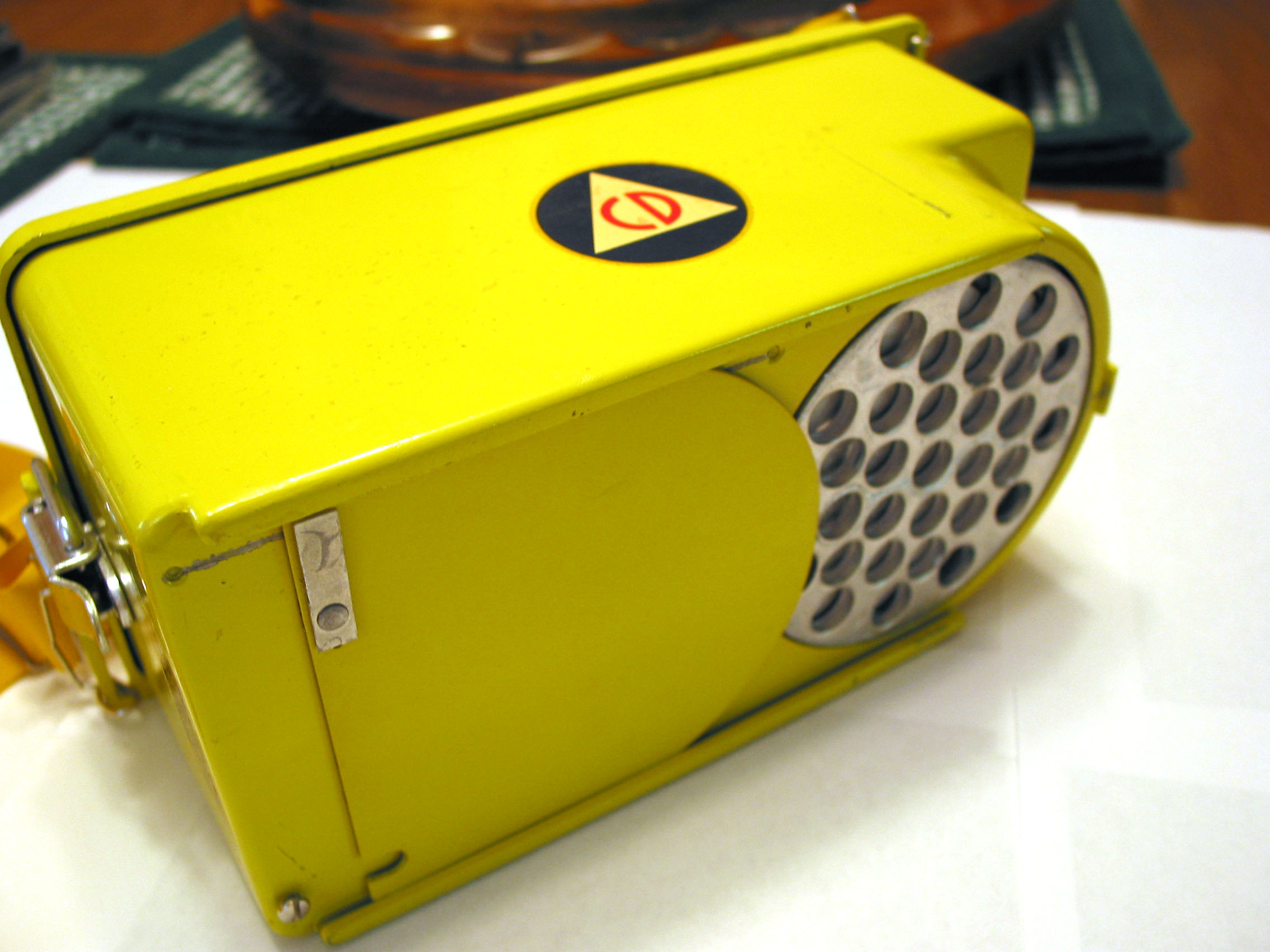
View of sliding beta shield on integral hand held instrument

Ion chambers are widely used in hand held radiation survey meters to measure beta and gamma radiation. They are particularly preferred for high dose rate measurements and for gamma radiation they give good accuracy for energies above 50-100 keV.

There are two basic configurations; the "integral" unit with the chamber and electronics in the same case, and the "two-piece" instrument which has a separate ion chamber probe attached to the electronics module by a flexible cable.

The chamber of the integral instrument is generally at the front of the case facing downwards, and for beta/gamma instruments there is a window in the bottom of the casing. This usually has a sliding shield which enables discrimination between gamma and beta radiation. The operator closes the shield to exclude beta, and can thereby calculate the rate of each radiation type.

Some hand held instruments generate audible clicks similar to that produced by a G-M counter to assist operators, who use the audio feedback in radiation survey and contamination checks. As the ion chamber works in current mode, not pulse mode, this is synthesised from the radiation rate.

=== Installed ===
For industrial process measurements and interlocks with sustained high radiation levels, the ion chamber is the preferred detector. In these applications only the chamber is situated in the measurement area, and the electronics are remotely situated to protect them from radiation and connected by a cable. Installed instruments can be used for measuring ambient gamma for personnel protection and normally sound an alarm above a preset rate, though the Geiger–Müller tube instrument is generally preferred where high levels of accuracy are not required.

== General precautions in use ==
Moisture is the main problem that affects the accuracy of ion chambers. The chamber's internal volume must be kept completely dry, and the vented type uses a desiccant to help with this. Because of the very low currents generated, any stray leakage current must be kept to a minimum in order to preserve accuracy. Invisible hygroscopic moisture on the surface of cable dielectrics and connectors can be sufficient to cause a leakage current which will swamp any radiation-induced ion current. This requires scrupulous cleaning of the chamber, its terminations and cables, and subsequent drying in an oven. "Guard rings" are generally used as a design feature on higher voltage tubes to reduce leakage through or along the surface of tube connection insulators, which can require a resistance in the order of 10^{13} Ω.

For industrial applications with remote electronics, the ion chamber is housed in a separate enclosure which provides mechanical protection and contains a desiccant to remove moisture which could affect the termination resistance.

In installations where the chamber is a long distance from the measuring electronics, readings can be affected by external electromagnetic radiation acting on the cable. To overcome this a local converter module is often used to translate the very low ion chamber currents to a pulse train or data signal related to the incident radiation. These are immune to electromagnetic effects.

== Applications ==
=== Nuclear industry ===
Ionization chambers are widely used in the nuclear industry as they provide an output that is proportional to radiation dose. They find wide use in situations where a constant high dose rate is being measured as they have a greater operating lifetime than standard Geiger–Müller tubes, which suffer from gas break down and are generally limited to a life of about 10^{11} count events. Additionally, the Geiger–Müller tube cannot operate above about 10^{4} counts per second, due to dead-time effects, whereas there is no similar limitation on the ion chamber.

=== Smoke detectors ===
The ionization chamber has found wide and beneficial use in smoke detectors. In an ionisation type smoke detector, ambient air is allowed to freely enter the ionization chamber. The chamber contains a small amount of americium-241, which is an emitter of alpha particles which produce a constant ion current. If smoke enters the detector, it disrupts this current because ions strike smoke particles and are neutralized. This drop in current triggers the alarm. The detector also has a reference chamber which is sealed but is ionized in the same way. Comparison of the ion currents in the two chambers allows compensation for changes due to air pressure, temperature, or the ageing of the source.

=== Medical radiation measurement ===
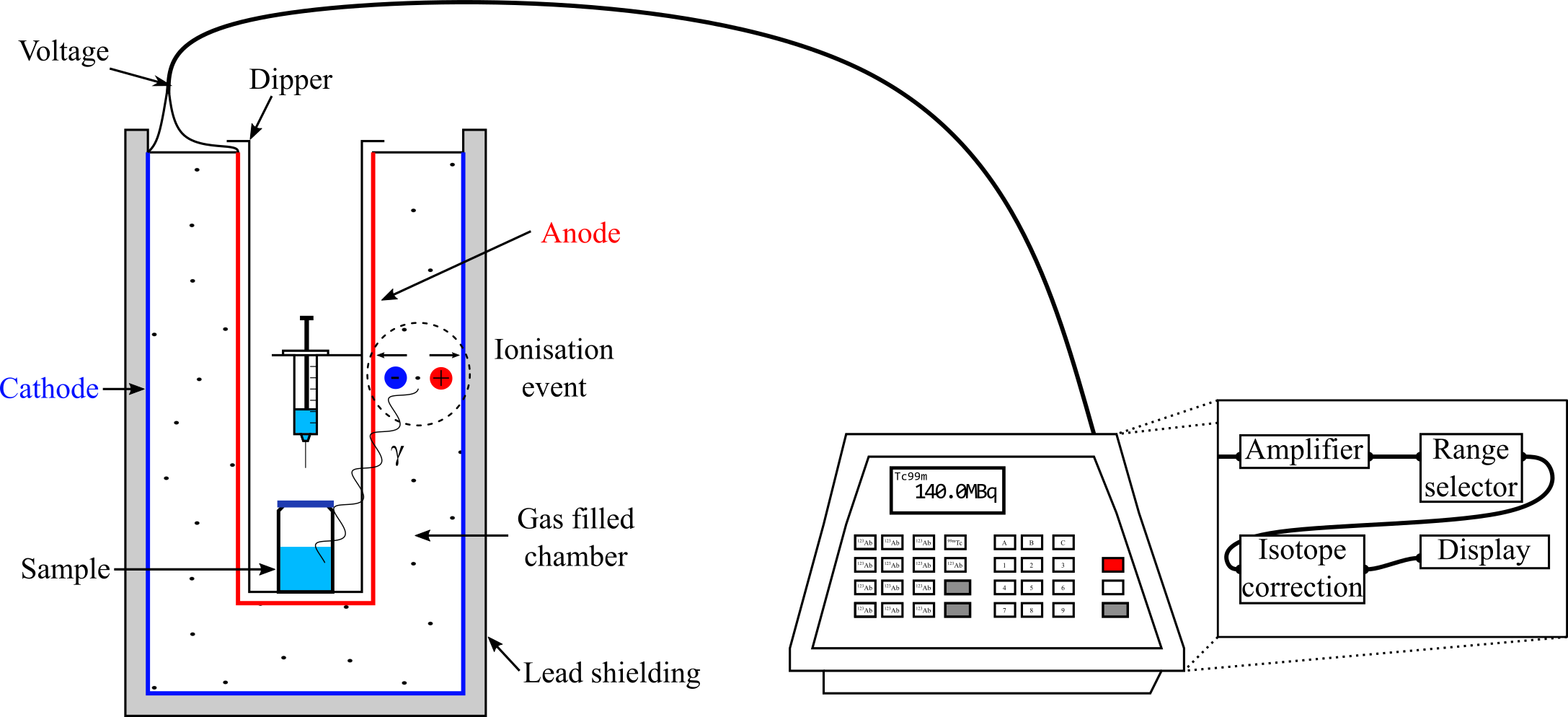
Diagram of a nuclear medicine dose calibrator or radionuclide calibrator that uses a "well-type" ionization chamber. The dipper is used to give a reproducible source position. The radioactive substance in this example is liquid.

In medical physics and radiotherapy, ionization chambers are used to ensure that the dose delivered from a therapy unit or radiopharmaceutical is what is intended. The devices used for radiotherapy are called "reference dosimeters", while those used for radiopharmaceuticals are called radioisotope dose calibrators - an inexact name for radionuclide radioactivity calibrators, which are used for measurement of radioactivity but not absorbed dose. A chamber will have a calibration factor established by a national standards laboratory such as ARPANSA in Australia or the NPL in the UK, or will have a factor determined by comparison against a transfer standard chamber traceable to national standards at the user's site.

=== Guidance on application use ===
In the United Kingdom the HSE has issued a user guide on selecting the correct radiation measurement instrument for the particular application concerned. This covers all radiation instrument technologies, and is a useful comparative guide to the use of ion chamber instruments.

== See also ==
- Absorbed dose
- Bragg–Gray cavity theory
- Dosimetry
- Gaseous ionization detector
- Sievert chamber
- Stopping power (particle radiation)
