= Henry Hallett Dale =

English pharmacologist and physiologist (1875–1968)

Sir Henry Hallett Dale OM GBE FRS
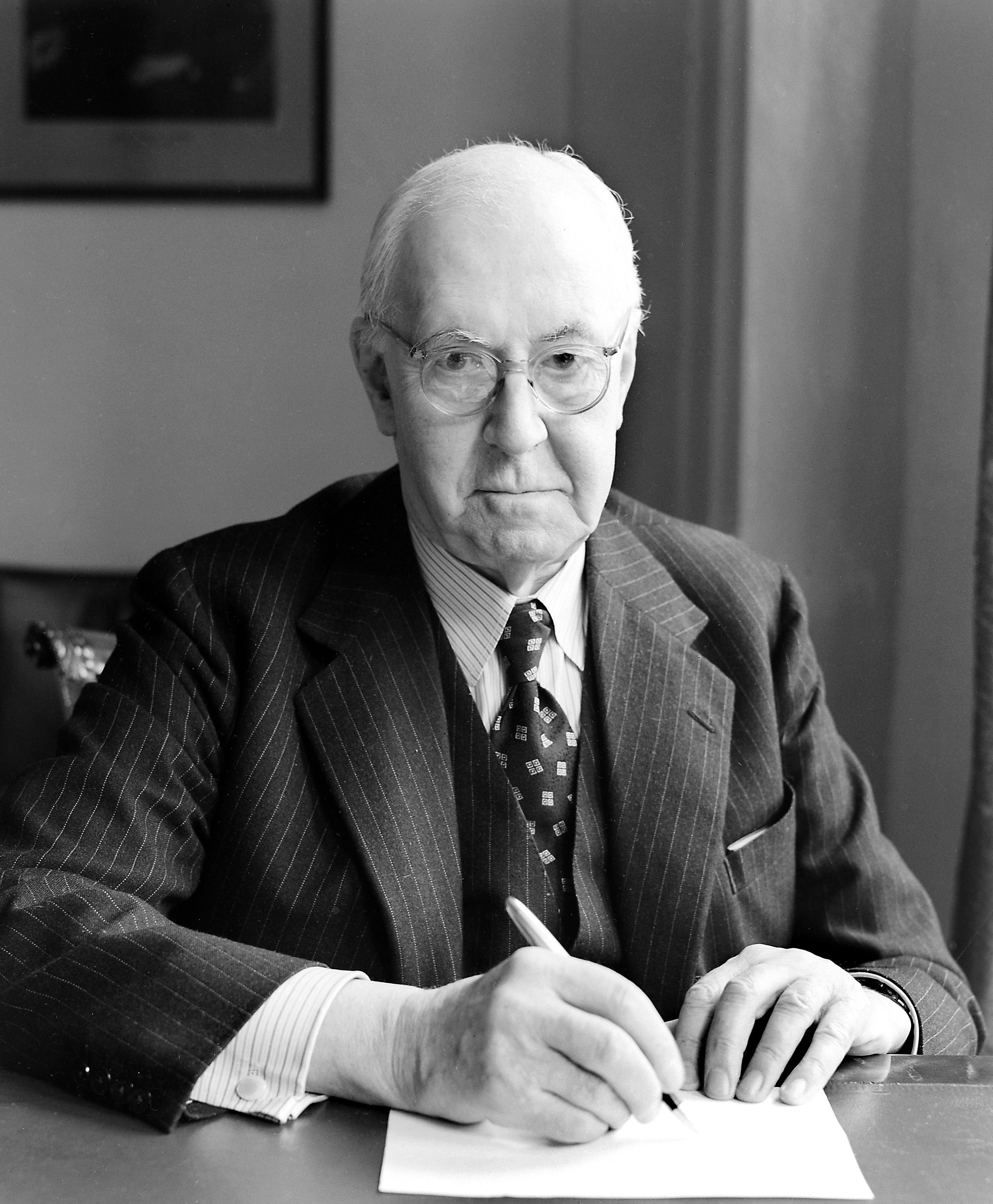
- Born: Henry Hallett Dale; 9 June 1875; Islington, London, England
- Died: 23 July 1968 (aged 93); Cambridge, England
- Education: Tollington School; The Leys School
- Alma mater: University of Cambridge; St Bartholomew's Hospital
- Known for: Acetylcholine; Dale's principle
- Awards: FRS (1914); Royal Medal (1924); Cameron Prize for Therapeutics of the University of Edinburgh (1926); Knight Bachelor (1932); Nobel Prize in Physiology or Medicine (1936); Copley Medal (1937); Knight Grand Cross (1943); Order of Merit (1944); Freedom of the City (Dundee) (1947); Albert Medal (1956)
- Scientific career
- Fields: Pharmacology; Physiology
- Website: www.rigb.org/our-history/people/d/henry-hallett-dale

Sir Henry Hallett Dale (9 June 1875 – 23 July 1968) was an English pharmacologist and physiologist. For his study of acetylcholine as agent in the chemical transmission of nerve pulses (neurotransmission) he shared the 1936 Nobel Prize in Physiology or Medicine with Otto Loewi.

== Early life and education ==
Henry Hallett Dale was born in Islington, London, to Charles James Dale, a pottery manufacturer from Staffordshire, and his wife, Frances Anne Hallett, daughter of a furniture manufacturer, from South Devon. Henry was the third of seven children, one of whom (his younger brother, Benjamin Dale) became an accomplished composer and warden of the Royal Academy of Music. Henry was educated at the local Tollington Park College and then The Leys School Cambridge (one of the school's houses is named after him) and in 1894 entered Trinity College, Cambridge, working under the physiologist John Langley. For a few months in 1903 he also studied under Paul Ehrlich in Frankfurt, Germany. Also in 1903, Dale assisted Ernest Starling and William Bayliss in the vivisection of a dog, by removing the dog's pancreas and then killing the dog with a knife, which ultimately led to the events of the Brown Dog affair. Dale received his Doctor of Medicine degree from Cambridge in 1909.

== Career and research ==
While working at the University College London, he met and became friends with Otto Loewi. Dale became the director of the Department of Biochemistry and Pharmacology at the National Institute for Medical Research in London in 1914. He became a Fullerian Professor of Chemistry at the Royal Institution in 1942. During World War II he served on the scientific advisory panel to the Cabinet.

Although Dale and his colleagues first identified acetylcholine in 1914 as a possible neurotransmitter, Loewi showed its importance in the nervous system. The two men shared the 1936 Nobel Prize for Medicine.

During the 1940s Dale was embroiled in the scientific debate over the nature of signaling at the synapse. Dale and others believed that signaling at the synapse was chemical, while John Carew Eccles and others believed that the synapse was electrical. It was later found that most synaptic signalling is chemical, but there are some synapses that are electrical.

Dale also originated the scheme used to differentiate neurons according to the neurotransmitters they release. Thus, neurons releasing noradrenaline (known in the United States as norepinephrine) are called noradrenergic, neurons releasing GABA are GABAergic, and so on. This is called Dale's principle (sometimes erroneously referred to as Dale's Law), one interpretation of which holds that each neuron releases only one type of neurotransmitter. This particular interpretation of Dale's principle has been shown to be false, as many neurons release neuropeptides and amino acids in addition to classical neurotransmitters such as acetylcholine or biogenic amines (see cotransmission) (Bear, et al. 2001). This finding, that numerous neurotransmitters can be released by the same neuron, is referred to as the "coexistence principle." This phenomenon was most popularized by the Swedish neuroanatomist and neuropharmacologist Tomas Hökfelt, who is considered to be the "Father of the Coexistence Principle."

Between 1938 and 1960 Dale served as chairman of the Wellcome Trust. In honour of his work with both the Wellcome Trust and the MRC, on his retirement a small boat equipped with medical facilities was built and named The Lady Dale, and served on the River Gambia to provide medical care for the next thirty years.

=== Awards and honours ===
Dale was elected a Fellow of the Royal Society (FRS) in 1914. In 1926, he was awarded the Cameron Prize for Therapeutics of the University of Edinburgh. He was elected to the American Academy of Arts and Sciences in 1927, the American Philosophical Society in 1939, and the United States National Academy of Sciences in 1940. He was knighted in 1932, receiving the Knight Grand Cross of the Order of the British Empire in 1943 and the Order of Merit in 1944. He served as president of the Royal Society from 1940 to 1945 and president of the Royal Society of Medicine from 1948 to 1950. The Sir Henry Dale Fellowships of the Wellcome Trust are named in his honour and the Society for Endocrinology awards the Dale Medal annually in his honour.

== Personal life ==
In 1904, Dale had married his first cousin Ellen Harriett Hallett and had a son and two daughters. One of their daughters, Alison Sarah Dale, married Alexander R. Todd, who won the 1957 Nobel Prize in Chemistry and served as President of the Royal Society from 1975 to 1980. The Dales lived at Mount Vernon House from 1919 to 1942.

Sir Henry was made Master of the Worshipful Company of Salters in 1952. The Dales's residency at the house is marked by a Greater London Council blue plaque erected in 1981 on the garden wall of the house.

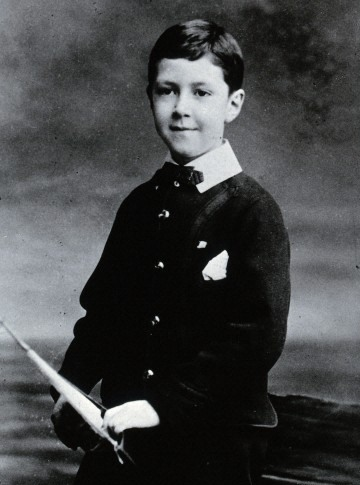
Dale as a child

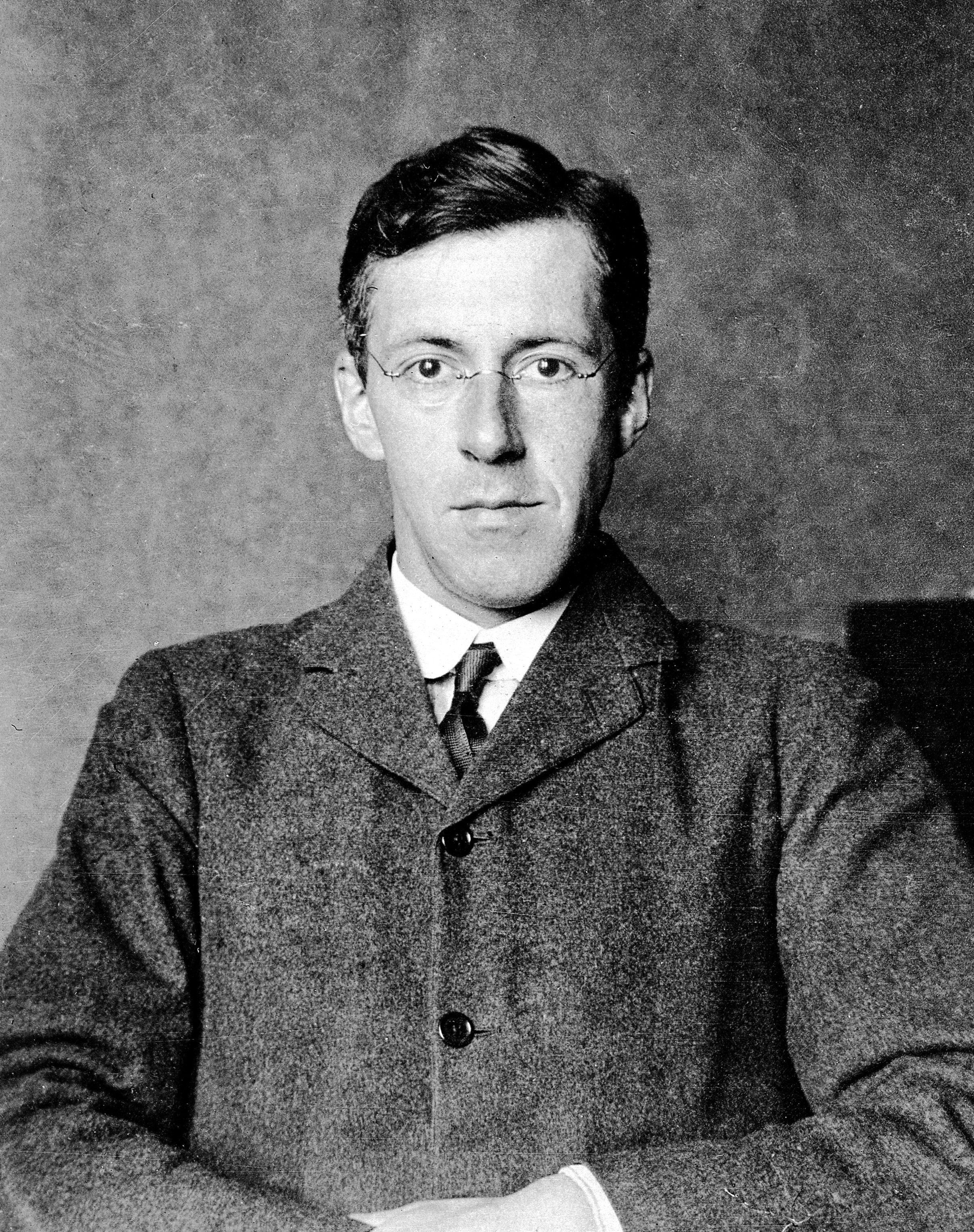
Dale in 1904

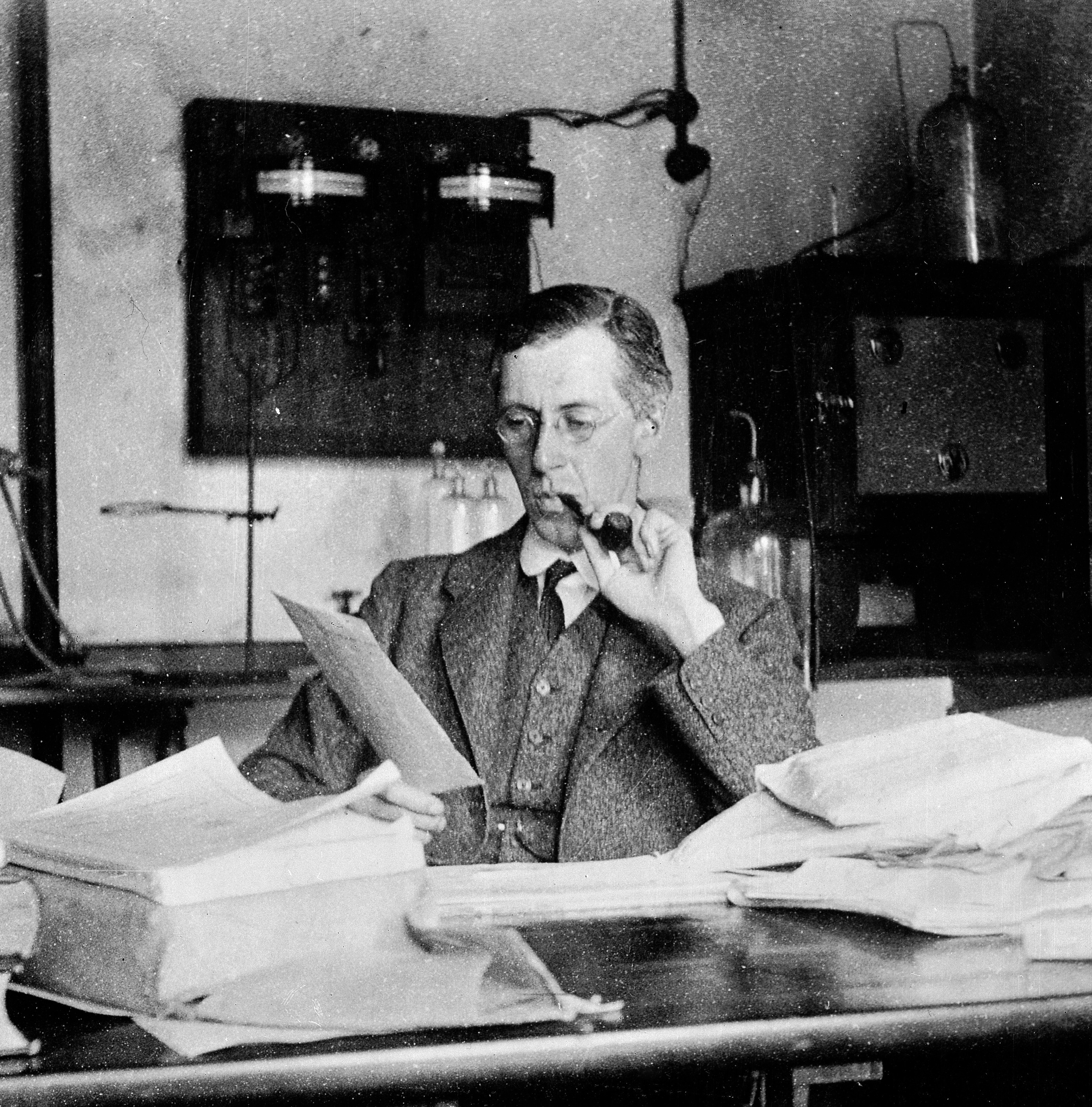
Dale in 1918

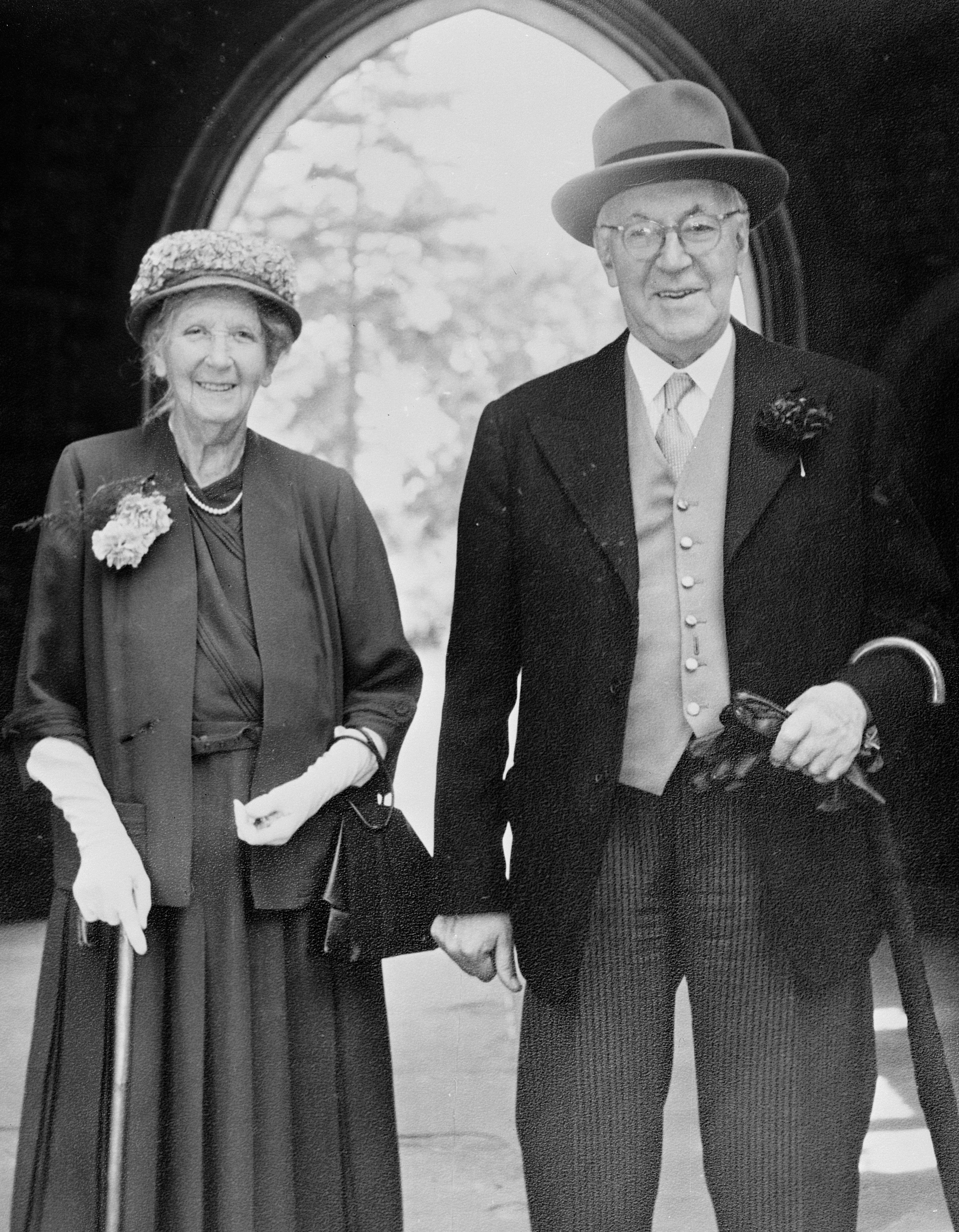
Dale with wife

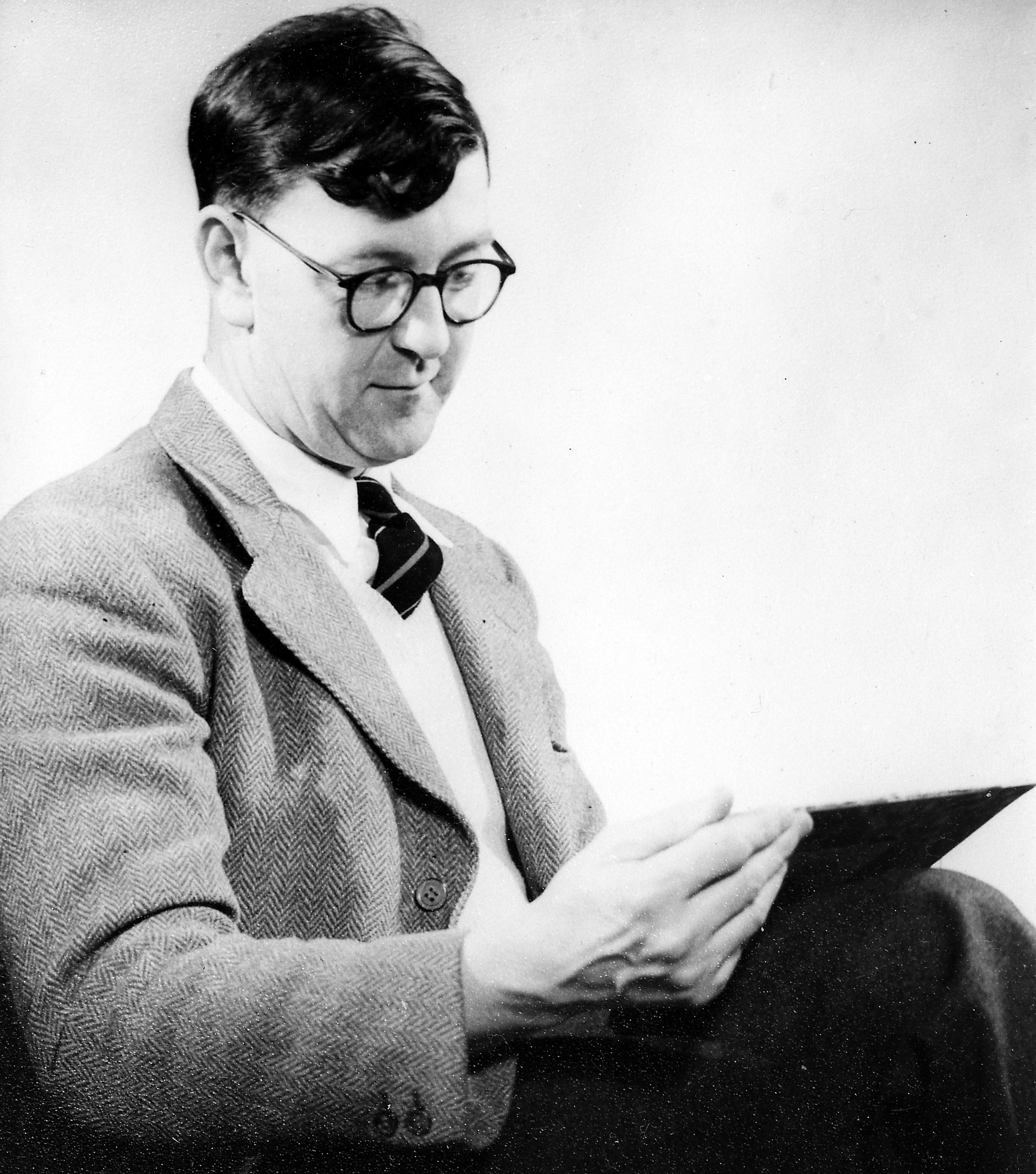
Son of Henry Hallett Dale

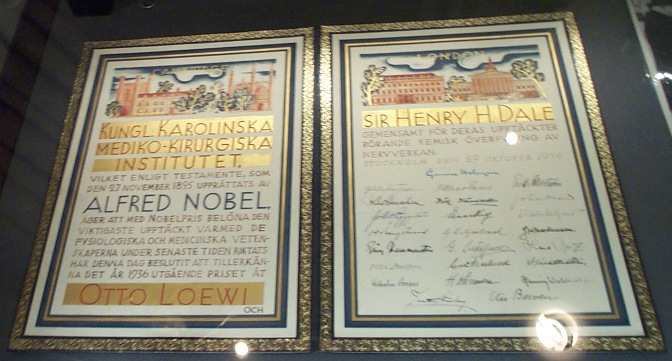
The Nobel Prize diploma of Dale, displayed in the Royal Society, London.

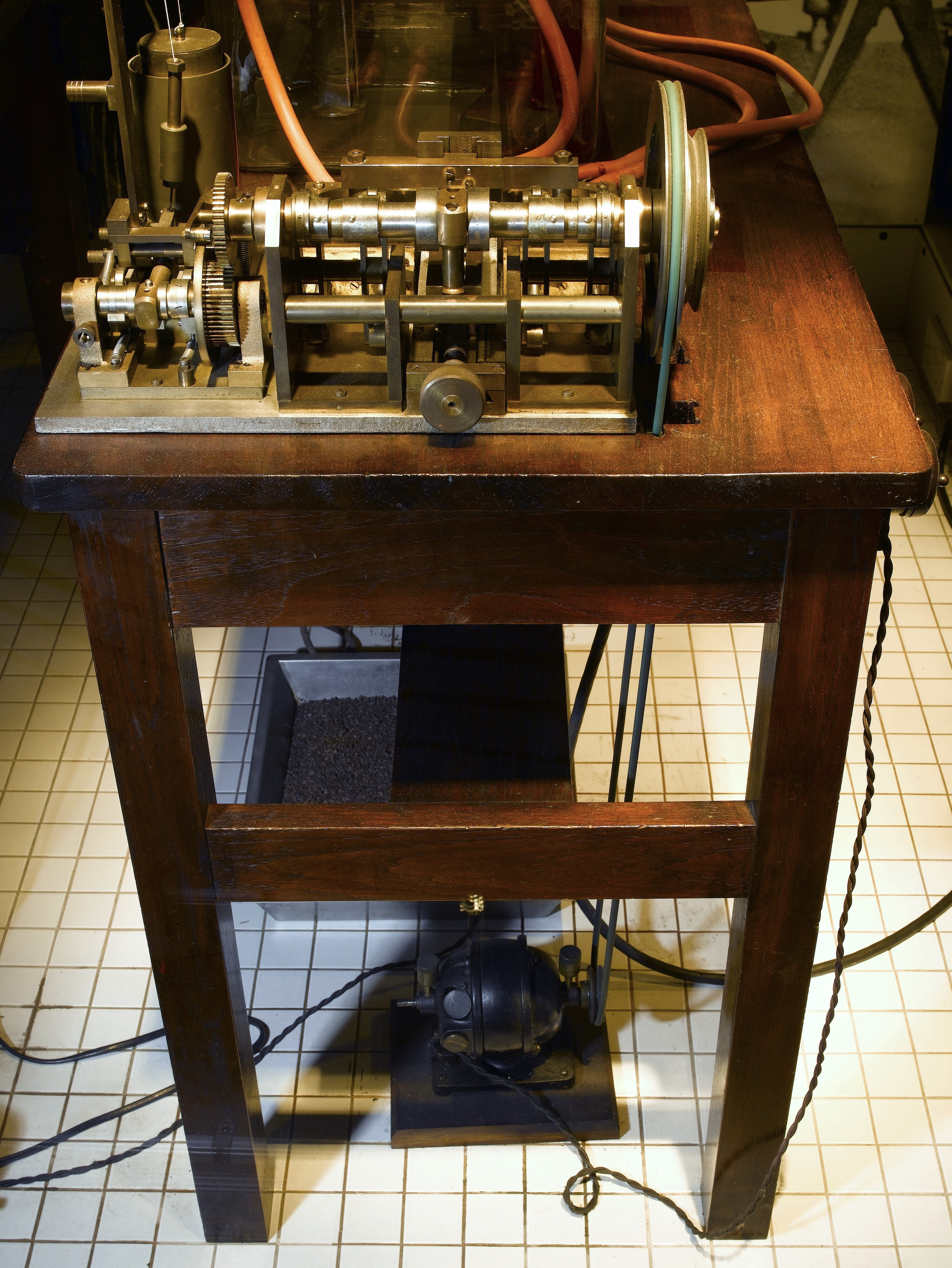
Dale-Schuster blood pump

== See also ==
- List of presidents of the Royal Society

Professional and academic associations
Preceded by William Henry Bragg	47th President of the Royal Society; 1940–1945	Succeeded by Robert Robinson
