= Samuel Haslam Scott =

British businessman (born 1960)

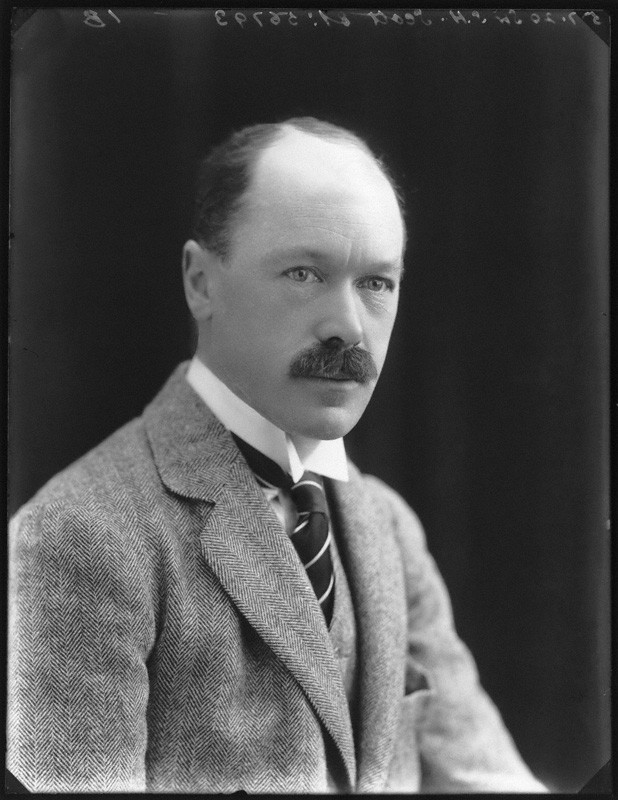
- Scott in 1920
- Born: 7 August 1875
- Died: 26 June 1960 (aged 84)
- Occupations: Businessman, author

Sir Samuel Haslam Scott, 2nd Baronet (7 August 1875 – 26 June 1960) was a businessman, author, philanthropist and important figure in the history of the National Trust in the Lake District in North West England.

== Life ==
Samuel Scott was schooled privately and went to university at Oriel College, Oxford receiving a B.A. and M.A. by 1902. Initially, he had little interest in the family insurance business and his father considered buying him a country estate, but this later changed. Samuel Scott was a director of The Provincial Insurance Company from 1903 until he died in 1960 and chairman from the death of his father in 1913 to 1946.

Before the first world war Scott had wanted to move the headquarters of The Provincial to Westmorland to benefit his wife Carmen's health and be closer to friends but this was vetoed by his father James. Samuel moved to Bowness but spent a lot of time in Bolton running the company, particularly during the war. Due to the ill health of his brother Francis, the official managing director, from 1913 to 1920 Samuel was effectively the manager of the Provincial but he moved out of daily management of the company in the 1920s. The head office of The Provincial moved to Kendal and shortly after the end of the war employed fifty people. It subsequently grew significantly.

During the 1920s Scott significantly diversified his activities, becoming a board member of a publisher in London, writing books, taking senior roles in local agricultural societies and in 1926 becoming High Sheriff of Westmorland. He also showed his Rough Fell sheep at local shows. He became a Justice of the Peace in 1927. He was an active member of the Cumberland and Westmorland Antiquarian and Archaeological Society, writing articles about ancient monuments, and eventually became vice-president.

Scott made personal gifts and arranged significant fundraising to enable purchases of property by the National Trust in the Lake District. It was written that '... with the single exception of Mrs William Heelis, no single benefactor has ever done so much for the preservation of the scenery of Lakeland.' For example, Keld chapel underwent restoration before being presented by him in 1918 to the Trust.

The Sir Samuel Scott of Yews Trust was formed in 1951 and still operates. It makes grants towards medical research.

== Family ==
Samuel Scott was the eldest son of Sir James Scott, 1st Baronet and Anne Jane Haslam.

Scott married Carmen Estelle Heuer on 4 April 1905. They had three children:

- Mary Margareta Scott (died 9 March 1960)
- Anne Katharine Sibella Scott (born 1912)
- James Philip Edmund Scott (born 13 August 1915, died in Libya 31 May 1942)

His first wife died in 1919 and Scott married secondly Nancy Lilian Anderson on 8 March 1920. They had one son:

- Sir Oliver Christopher Anderson Scott, 3rd Baronet (born 6 November 1922, died 4 November 2016).

Scott's second wife died in 1935 and he married thirdly Marion Dorothy Garnett on 7 January 1937. There were no children of the third marriage.

Scott died on 23 June 1960 at age 84 and was succeeded in the baronetcy by his younger but only surviving son, Oliver.

== Selected works ==
- A Westmorland Village; The Story of the Old Homesteads and "Statesman" Families of Troutbeck by Windermere, 1904
- Sir James William Scott: A Short Memoir, Oxford University Press, 1914
- Robino, and Other Stories. Translated, 1932
- Personal Account. Some Recollections of Fifty Years of the Provincial Insurance Company, Sir S.H. Scott and F.C. Scott, 1953
- The Exemplary Mr. Day, 1748-1789
- The Silver Ship. Essays and sketches, frivolous and grave
- Vignettes of Childhood. Sketches and reflections

== See also ==
- Low Yews farmhouse

== Bibliography ==
- Westall, Oliver M. (1992). The Provincial Insurance Company 1903-1938: Family, Markets, and Competitive Growth. Manchester: Manchester University Press u.a. ISBN 9780719036378.

Baronetage of the United Kingdom
Preceded by James Scott	Baronet (of Yews); 1913–1960	Succeeded by Oliver Christopher Anderson Scott
