= Bragg–Gray cavity theory =

Bragg–Gray cavity theory relates the radiation dose in a cavity volume of material $g$ to the dose that would exist in a surrounding medium $m$ in the absence of the cavity volume. It was developed in 1936 by British scientists Louis Harold Gray, William Henry Bragg, and William Lawrence Bragg.

Most often, material $g$ is assumed to be a gas, however Bragg–Gray cavity theory applies to any cavity volume (gas, liquid, or solid) that meets the following Bragg-Gray conditions.

1. The dimensions of the cavity containing $g$ is small with respect to the range of charged particles striking the cavity so that the cavity does not perturb the charged particle field. That is, the cavity does not change the number, energy, or direction of the charged particles that would exist in $m$ in the absence of the cavity.
2. The absorbed dose in the cavity containing $g$ is deposited entirely by charged particles crossing it.

When the Bragg-Gray conditions are met, then

$$D_m =  D_g \cdot
\bar{ \Bigl(\frac{S}{\rho} \Bigr)}^m_g$$,

where

$D_m$ is the dose to material $m$ (SI unit Gray)
$D_g$ is the dose to the cavity material $g$ (SI unit Gray)
$\bar{ \Bigl(\frac{S}{\rho} \Bigr)}^m_g$ is the ratio of the mass-electronic stopping powers (also known as mass-collision stopping powers) of $m$ and $g$ averaged over the charged particle fluence crossing the cavity.

In an ionization chamber, the dose to material $g$ (typically a gas) is

$$D_g =  \frac{Q}{m_g} \cdot
\bar{ \Bigl(\frac{W}{e} \Bigr)}_g$$

where

$Q$ is the ionization per unit volume produced in the $g$ (SI unit Coulomb)
$m_g$ is the mass of the gas (SI unit kg)
$\bar{ \Bigl(\frac{W}{e} \Bigr)}_g$ is the mean energy required to produce an ion pair in $g$ divided by the charge of an electron (SI units Joules/Coulomb)

== See also ==
- Ionizing radiation
- Ionization chamber

== Sources ==
1. Khan, F. M. (2003). The physics of radiation therapy (3rd ed.). Lippincott Williams & Wilkins: Philadelphia. ISBN 978-0-7817-3065-5.
2. Gray, Louis Harold (1936). "An ionization method for the absolute measurement of $\gamma$-ray energy". Proceedings of the Royal Society A. 156: 578–596. doi:10.1098/rspa.1936.0169.
3. Attix, F.H. (1986). Introduction to Radiological Physics and Radiation Dosimetry, Wiley-Interscience: New York. ISBN 0-471-01146-0.
4. Ma, Chang-ming; Nahum, A. E. (1991). "Bragg-Gray theory and ion chamber dosimetry for photon beams". Physics in Medicine & Biology. 36 (4): 13–428. doi:10.1088/0031-9155/36/4/001. PMID 1904583.
