= Edmund John Niemann =

British painter (1813–1876)

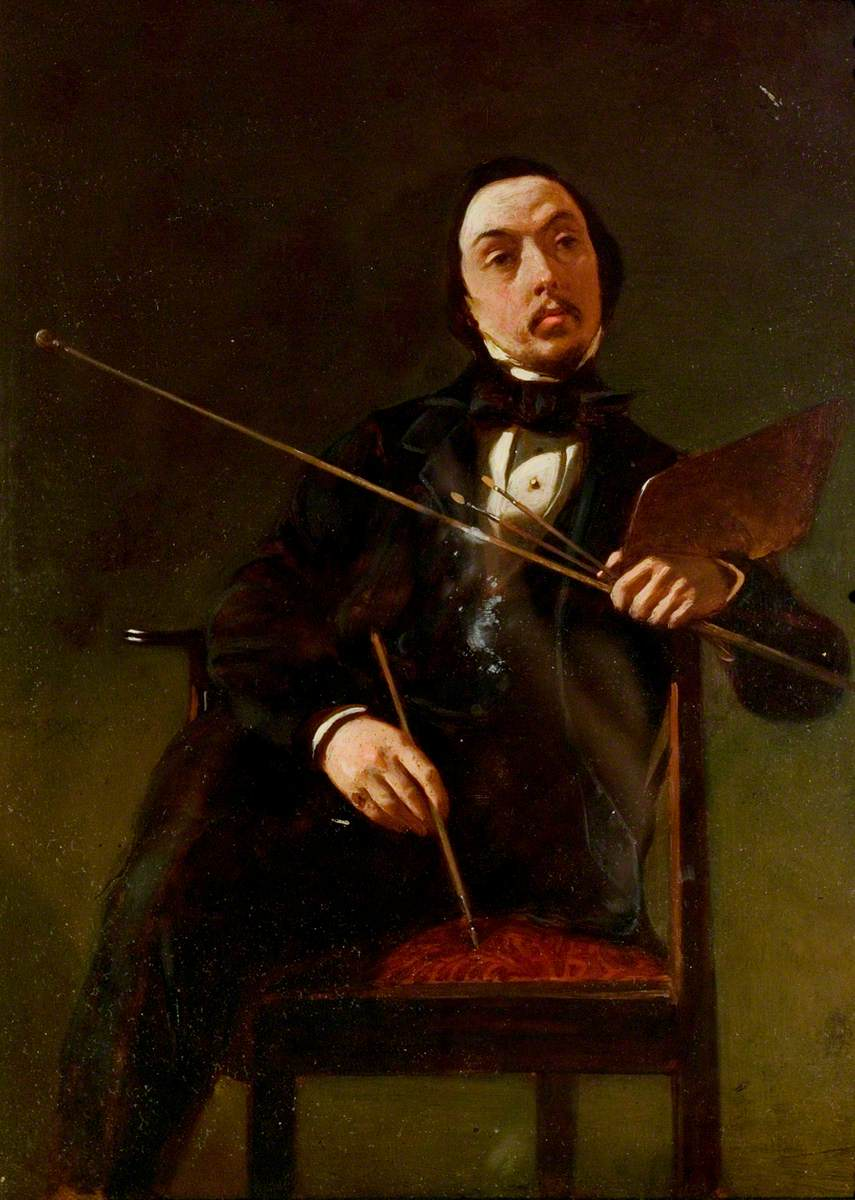
- Born: Islington, London
- Died: 15 April 1876 (aged 63); Brixton Hill, Surrey, England

Edmund John Niemann (1813 – 15 April 1876) was a prolific and highly successful British landscape artist working mostly in oils. Nine of his paintings are held in the Wolverhampton Art Gallery.

== Life and work ==
Niemann was born in Islington, London in 1813. His father, John Diedrich Niemann, was a native of Minden, Westphalia and was a member of Lloyd's, working in the City of London. As a young man, Edmund was employed as a clerk at Lloyd's, but he decided to devote himself to art and in 1839 settled in High Wycombe, Buckinghamshire, mostly painting out of doors. Though he especially enjoyed painting the scenery of the Thames and of the River Swale, near Richmond in Yorkshire, many other areas of the British Isles are covered in the corpus of his work.

Between 1844 and 1872, he exhibited paintings at a wide range of prestigious galleries including the Royal Academy, the British Institution, the Society of British Artists in Suffolk St, the Royal Scottish Academy, the Royal Institute, the Glasgow Institute, the Paris Salon, the Liverpool Academy of Arts and the Manchester Academy of Fine Arts. The first picture exhibited was a view "On the Thames, near Great Marlow, Bucks" – a small canvas shown at the Royal Academy in 1844.

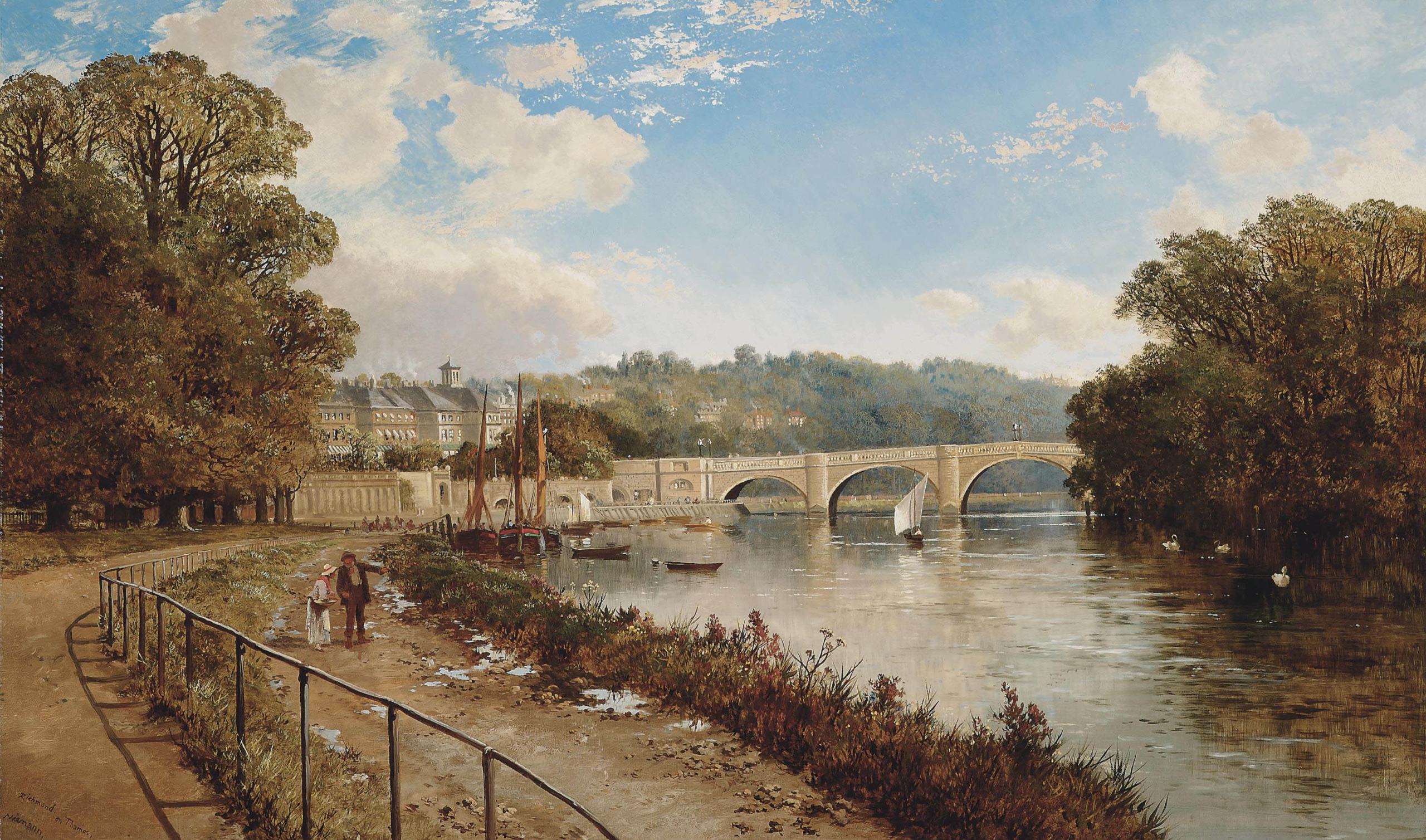
Richmond on Thames

Niemann and a number of other artists, including Edward Armitage were dissatisfied with the exclusiveness showed by the management of several leading art societies. In 1848 Niemann returned to London for the foundation of the 'Free Exhibition' held in the Chinese Gallery at Hyde Park Corner. This exhibition opened with 500 works of art including sculpture. In 1850 this became the Portland Gallery, Regent Street, and Niemann was chosen as one of the trustees and honorary secretary. The society later assumed the name 'The National Institution'. The existence of the society was short lived with 1861 seeing the last of their exhibitions.

Niemann lived at Mount Vernon House in Hampstead in the 1850s.

His paintings are characterised by great versatility, natural colours, and visual realism, often in the romantic artistic style of J. M. W. Turner, Corot and Caspar David Friedrich. His son, Edward H. Niemann, was also a painter imitating his father's style.

Ill for a number of years in his later life, Niemann died suddenly at Brixton Hill, Surrey of apoplexy on 15 April 1876.

== Works ==
(dates given where known)

- On the Thames, near Great Marlow, Bucks, 1844
- Dovedale, Derbyshire, 1847
- Buckingham Street, Strand, 1854
- Fishing by the Dam, 1855
- Fishing Near Godalming, 1858
- View of Richmond, Yorkshire, 1859
- A charming view of Stapleton, 1860
- Landscape near Rochester, 1860
- Landscape with a view of Lincoln, 1861
- Town and Vale of Ffestiniog, 1864
- Shooter's Hill Farm, Hampstead, 1866 (private collection, Holland, Michigan)
- Ffestiniog, 1870
- Windsor Castle from Cooper's Hill, Runnymede, 1876
- Pateley Moor, North Yorkshire, 1879 (with Alfred Frank de Prades)
- Pynford, Near Surrey
- An Extensive River Landscape
- Fabbriche di Careggine, Tuscany
- On the Eden, near Carlisle
- Bucks Damaged by Flood, Mapledurham, Berks, Morning
- The Force, Richmond, Yorkshire
- A View in Yorkshire
- Goodrich Castle and the Wye
- The Old Watermill
- Mediterranean Harbour Scene
- Ludlow, Shropshire
- A View of Nottingham
- The Elbor Rocks Looking Towards Glastonbury
- View of Whitby
- On the Wharfe
- On the East Coast
- Cranbrook, Kent
- Richmond Upon Thames, 1868
- Mountainous Landscape
- The Golden Age
- Farmhands on Horseback and Cattle at Water's Edge
- The Coming Storm
