= Hillingdon Hospital =

- The Hillingdon Hospitals NHS Foundation Trust
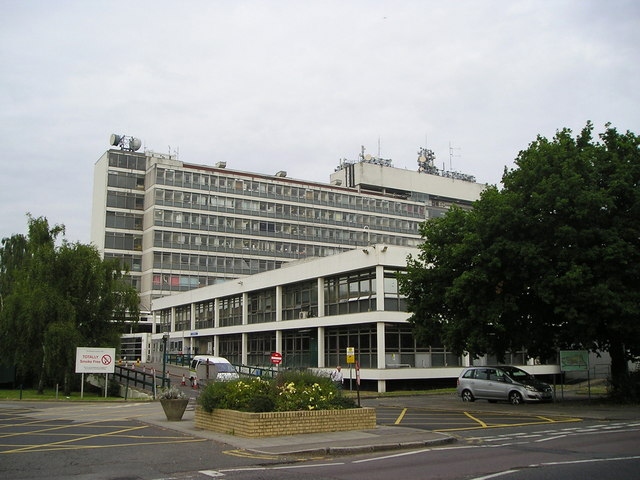
- Hillingdon Hospital

Geography
- Location: Hillingdon, London, England
- Coordinates: 51.5260°N 0.4619°W

Organisation
- Care system: National Health Service
- Affiliated university: Brunel University London; Buckinghamshire New University; Imperial College School of Medicine

Services
- Emergency department: Yes
- Beds: 509

History
- Founded: 1838; 188 years ago

Links
- Website: thh.nhs.uk/hillingdon-hospital

Hillingdon Hospital is a hospital in Hillingdon, London. It is one of two hospitals run by The Hillingdon Hospitals NHS Foundation Trust, the other being Mount Vernon Hospital.

== History ==
The hospitals has its origins in a workhouse infirmary built in 1838. A separate female infirmary was not added until 1907. The facility came under the management of Middlesex County Council in 1929 and the council started to develop the site in 1932. The works included replacing the wooden floors with concrete ones, the wooden ones being too weak to cope with the weight of an operating theatre table and equipment.

The hospital was damaged by bombs in October 1940, causing much damage. There were no casualties, and the hospital was moved to temporary accommodation. This proved to be unpopular, and following the war, the number of beds in the hospital declined due to a lack of staff. The medical director of the time, W. Arklay Steel, was concerned about the poor condition of the hospital. In 1948, when the hospital joined the National Health Service, it consisted of a series of temporary buildings in varying states of disrepair. In 1957, it was agreed to rebuild Hillingdon Hospital and, in 1960, a new maternity wing was opened by the Duchess of Kent.

Sir Arnold France, Permanent Secretary of the Ministry of Health, opened the new Hillingdon Hospital on 10 January 1967. It had cost £3.2 million to build. It provided seven new wards, including the provision of some single rooms, outpatients department, imaging department, accident and emergency services, operating theatres and recovery suites, pathology laboratories, physiotherapy, occupational therapy and a canteen. A central vacuum system and piped oxygen were available throughout the hospital.

In December 2008, Bevan Ward was opened. This ward, named in honour of the founder of the NHS, Aneurin Bevan, consisted of three clusters of eight ensuite patient rooms. It was visited in April 2009 by Health Secretary Alan Johnson, who was apparently struck by the high level of patient satisfaction. The newly refurbished Fleming Ward opened in November 2009.

An eye clinic at the hospital received an award in August 2010 from the Macular Disease Society for its work in macular degeneration. An urgent care centre, for non-life-threatening injuries, opened at the hospital in 2013.

== Services ==
The hospital has a PALS office based on site and its own hospital radio station (Radio Hillingdon), staffed by volunteers.

== Criticism ==
Hillingdon Hospital has received criticism over the years: in 2003, there was a case of post-mortem desecration of a body. Additionally, a high MRSA hospital infection rate was recorded; and several complaints regarding the expensive parking on site. Hygiene standards have been criticised on several occasions, achieving the dubious award of being fourth worst for hygiene in a survey from the Healthcare Commission.

Hillingdon Hospital is in a very poor state of repair. Children had to be moved out of the paediatric ward and paediatric outpatients units were closed because patient safety could not be guaranteed. The hospital needs to be completely rebuilt but there is disagreement over where the new hospital should be.

== New Hospital ==
In September 2019, the Trust received a share, as one of 21 hospitals, of a £100 million fund to develop a business case for its redevelopment. A full redevelopment at its current site is expressed as its preferred option, and the trust is working to a timeline which would grant it approval for its business case and for construction to start in 2027/28, with a budget of £1-1.5bn.

== Transport ==
The hospital is served by London Buses routes U1, U2, U3, U4, U5 and U7. The nearest train stations are Uxbridge on the Metropolitan and Piccadilly lines and West Drayton on the Great Western Main Line (Elizabeth line).

== Sources ==
- Howard, Wingfield (2003). The Workhouse and Hospital at Hillingdon (Middlesex.) 1744–1967 (PDF). Hillingdon Hospitals NHS Foundation Trust. Archived from the original (PDF) on 11 April 2009.
