= List of fellows of the Royal Society elected in 1914 =

This is a complete list of fellows of the Royal Society elected in 1914. There were no foreign members elected this year.

== Royal Fellow ==
- Arthur Frederick Patrick Albert, Prince of Great Britain and Ireland

== Fellows ==
- Edgar Johnson Allen
- Richard Assheton
- Geoffrey Thomas Bennett
- Sir Rowland Harry Biffen
- Arthur Edwin Boycott
- Clive Cuthbertson
- Sir Henry Hallett Dale
- Sir Arthur Stanley Eddington
- Edmund Johnston Garwood
- Sir Thomas Henry Havelock
- Thomas Martin Lowry
- Diarmid Noel Paton
- Siegfried Ruhemann
- Samuel Walter Johnson Smith
- Sir Thomas Edward Stanton

== Statute 12 ==
- Victor Christian William Cavendish, 9th Duke of Devonshire
- Edward Grey, Viscount Grey of Fallodon
