= The Hillingdon Hospitals NHS Foundation Trust =

NHS foundation trust in North West London

- Type: NHS foundation trust
- Established: 21 December 1990
- Headquarters: Hillingdon, London, England
- Hospitals: Hillingdon Hospital; Mount Vernon Hospital
- Staff: 4,005 (2023/24)
- Website: www.thh.nhs.uk

The Hillingdon Hospitals NHS Foundation Trust is an NHS foundation trust responsible for the healthcare services provided at Hillingdon Hospital and Mount Vernon Hospital in the London Borough of Hillingdon.

The trust is part of Imperial College Health Partners.

== History ==
The trust was established as The Hillingdon Hospital NHS Trust on 21 December 1990, and became operational on 1 April 1991. It became an NHS foundation trust on 1 April 2011.

== Finance ==
The Trust recorded a deficit of £1 million in 2012-13 but predicted a break even position in 2013–14.

== Quality ==
The Care Quality Commission rated the trust as 'requires improvement' following a five-day inspection in October 2014. They were concerned at staffing levels and said the trust was not complying with infection prevention and control standards.

== Performance ==
In May 2015 the trust experienced a network infrastructure failure which required A&E attendances to be diverted to other nearby hospitals and delayed patient discharges. The trust spent £13.5 million on agency staff in 2014/5.

It was named by the Health Service Journal as one of the top hundred NHS trusts to work for in 2015. At that time it had 2608 full time equivalent staff and a sickness absence rate of 3.5%. 65% of staff recommend it as a place for treatment and 65% recommended it as a place to work.

In October 2016 only 56.7% of main A&E patients at the trust were seen within four hours — the worst performance in the country. 5,300 patients a month attend the department, which was designed for 2,500. The trust said "The sheer volume of patients being seen in the space available means it is difficult to manage the swift flow of patients." In March 2018 it was the second worst performer in England, with only 48.7% of patients in the main A&E seen within 4 hours, and 11 waiting more than 12 hours from the decision to admit to actual admission to a ward.
