= Dale's principle =

Principle in neuroscience

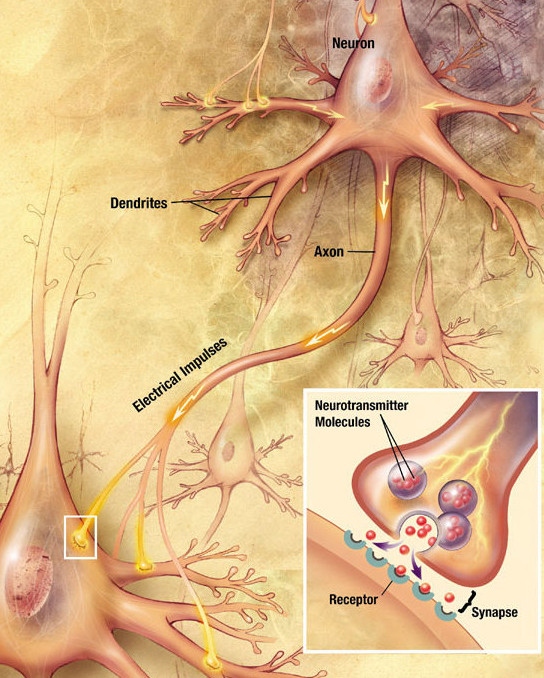
Illustration of the major elements in chemical synaptic transmission. An electrochemical wave called an action potential travels along the axon of a neuron. When the wave reaches a synapse, it provokes release of a puff of neurotransmitter molecules, which bind to chemical receptor molecules located in the membrane of another neuron, on the opposite side of the synapse.

In neuroscience, Dale's principle (or Dale's law) is a rule attributed to the English neuroscientist Henry Hallett Dale. The principle basically states that a neuron performs the same chemical action at all of its synaptic connections to other cells, regardless of the identity of the target cell. However, there has been disagreement about the precise wording.

Because of an ambiguity in the original statement, there are actually two versions of the principle, though it has been shown that neither holds universally. The term "Dale's principle" was first used by Sir John Eccles in 1954, in a passage reading, "In conformity with Dale's principle (1934, 1952) that the same chemical transmitter is released from all the synaptic terminals of a neurone…" Some modern writers have understood the principle to state that neurons release one and only one transmitter at all of their synapses, which is generally false. Others, including Eccles himself in later publications, have taken it to mean that neurons release the same set of transmitters at all of their synapses, which remains a rule of thumb, but with a few known exceptions.

Dale himself never stated his "principle" in an explicit form. The source that Eccles referred to was a lecture published by Dale in 1934, called Pharmacology and nerve endings, describing some of the early research into the physiology of neurotransmission. At that time, only two chemical transmitters were known, acetylcholine and noradrenaline (then thought to be adrenaline). In the peripheral nervous system, cholinergic and adrenergic transmission were known to arise from different groups of nerve fibers. Dale was interested in the possibility that a neuron releasing one of these chemicals in the periphery might also release the same chemical at central synapses. He wrote:

It is to be noted, further, that in the cases for which direct evidence is already available, the phenomena of regeneration appear to indicate that the nature of the chemical function, whether cholinergic or adrenergic, is characteristic for each particular neurone, and unchangeable.

And near the end of the paper:

When we are dealing with two different endings of the same sensory neurone, the one peripheral and concerned with vasodilatation and the other at a central synapse, can we suppose that the discovery and identification of a chemical transmitter of axon-reflex vasodilatation would furnish a hint as to the nature of the transmission process at a central synapse? The possibility has at least some value as a stimulus to further experiment.

With only two transmitter chemicals known to exist at the time, the possibility of a neuron releasing more than one transmitter at a single synapse did not enter anybody's mind, and so no care was taken to frame hypotheses in a way that took this possibility into account. The resulting ambiguity in the initial statements led to some confusion in the literature about the precise meaning of the principle. Nicoll and Malenka, for example, understood it to state that a neuron always releases one and only one neurotransmitter at all of its synapses. In this form it is certainly false. Many neurons release more than one neurotransmitter, in what is called "cotransmission". Although there were earlier hints, the first formal proposal of this discovery did not come until 1976. Most neurons release several different chemical messengers. In modern neuroscience, neurons are often classified by their neurotransmitter and most important cotransmitter, for example striatal GABA neurons utilize either opioid peptides or substance P as the primary cotransmitter.

In a 1976 publication, however, Eccles interpreted the principle in a subtly different way:

"I proposed that Dale’s Principle be defined as stating that at all the axonal branches of a neurone, there was liberation of the same transmitter substance or substances."

The addition of "or substances" is critical. With this change, the principle allows for the possibility of neurons releasing more than one transmitter, and only asserts that the same set are released at all synapses. In this form, it continues to be an important rule of thumb, with only a few known exceptions, including David Sulzer and Stephen Rayport's finding that dopamine neurons also release glutamate as a neurotransmitter, but at separate release sites.
