= Mount Vernon House, Hampstead =

House in Camden, London, England

Coordinates: 51.557°N 0.180°W

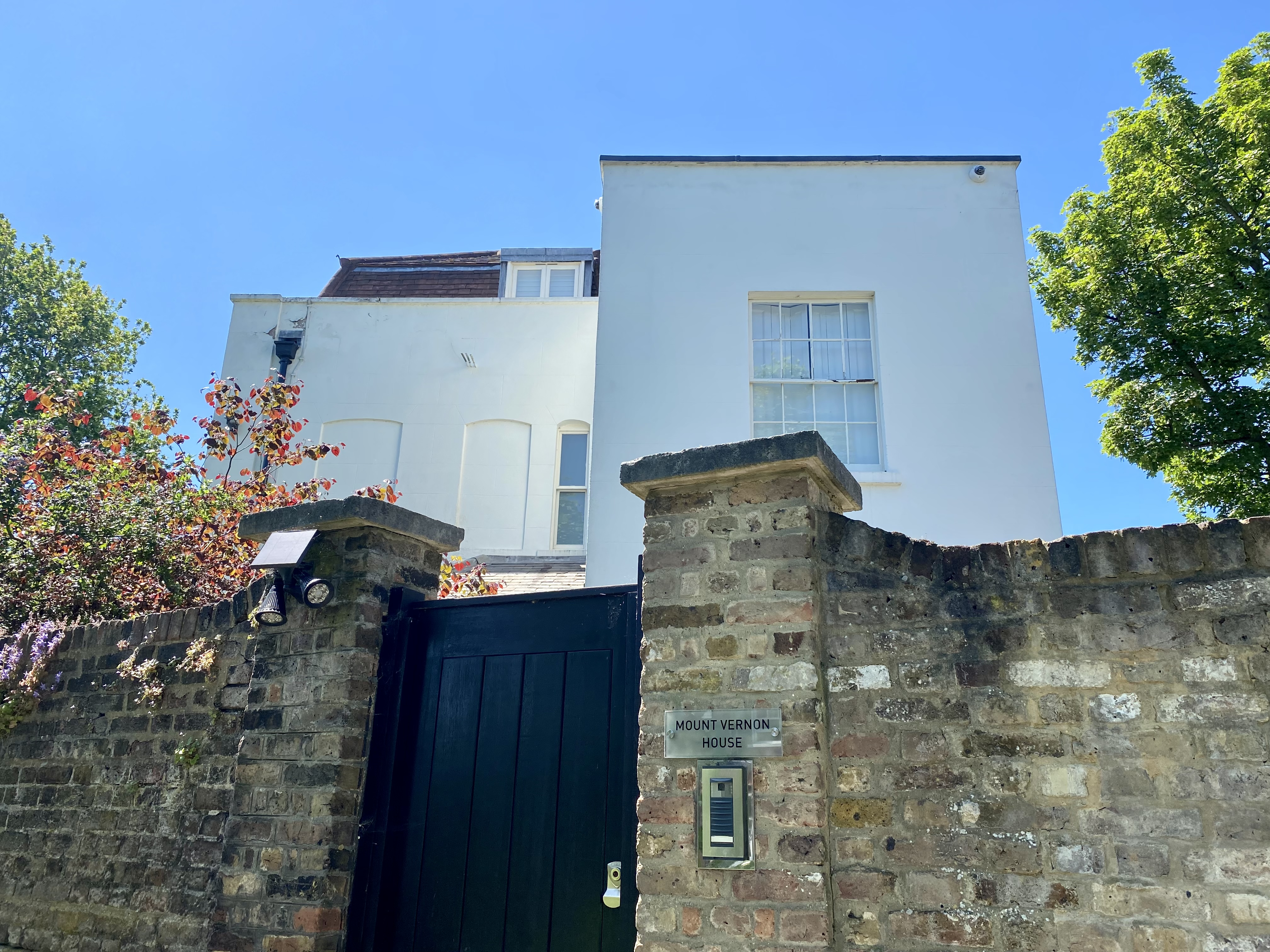
Mount Vernon House in June 2021

Mount Vernon House (originally Windmill Hill House) is a house in Hampstead in the London Borough of Camden. It has been listed Grade II on the National Heritage List for England (NHLE) since May 1974. The garden wall is separately listed at Grade II. The house was built around 1726 and was altered in the early 19th century. It is rendered in stucco with a mansard roof. The house occupies the site of a windmill. It was constructed between 1725 and 1728 by a local Hampstead timbersmith, William Knight.

The surgeon William Peirce lived at the house in the 1770s. General Charles Vernon leased the house from 1781 to 1800. The landscape painter Edmund John Niemann lived at Mount Vernon house in the 1850s. It was the residence of a Captain J.T. Campbell in the 1860s.

Mount Vernon House was the residence of the Hospital Secretary of Mount Vernon Hospital from 1903 and subsequently served as the hospital's Nurses' Home.

The tenure of the physician Henry Dale at the house is marked by a Greater London Council blue plaque erected in 1981 on the garden wall of the house. Dale and his wife, Elen, lived at the house from 1919 to 1942 and entertained many fellow scientists and researchers at the house including Charles Best and his wife Margaret. Margaret Best attended a dinner at the house during the war with other partners of scientists including Margaret, the wife of A.V. Hill, and Gertrude, the wife of William Bayliss.

In his Companion Guide to Outer London Simon Jenkins wrote that Mount Vernon House shares "with most of Hampstead's better mansions the characteristic of hiding behind both a high wall and a thick coating of ivy". The London: North edition of the Pevsner Architectural Guides also describes the house as "well hidden".

The house was restored and once again became a private house with the residential conversion of the Mount Vernon Hospital site by property developers Marylebone Warwick Balfour and Sincere.
