= Oxford Institute for Radiation Oncology =

MRC Oxford Institute for Radiation Oncology
- Formation: 1953 (as British Empire Cancer Campaign Research Unit in Radiobiology at Mount Vernon Hospital)
- Purpose: Radiation biology research
- Headquarters: Department of Oncology
- Location: University of Oxford, Oxford
- Director: Professor Amato Giaccia
- Affiliations: Medical Research Council (United Kingdom)
- Website: www.oncology.ox.ac.uk/mrc-oiro
- Formerly called: Gray Cancer Institute; Cancer Research Campaign Gray Laboratory; British Empire Cancer Campaign Research Unit in Radiobiology

The MRC Oxford Institute for Radiation Oncology (formerly the Gray Institute for Radiation Oncology and Biology) is a research institute at the Department of Oncology at the Medical Sciences Division at the University of Oxford in England. It focuses on the research of radiobiology and radiotherapy. It is funded by the Medical Research Council of the UK Research and Innovation under the British government.

== History ==
The institute was founded as the Gray Laboratory at Mount Vernon Hospital by Louis Harold Gray in 1953 as the world's first radiobiological institute. Early research focused on the oxygen effect to improve radio sensitivity of tumours. The institute at Mount Vernon was home to a unique 4 MeV heavy ion Van de Graaff accelerator.

Research on the effects of oxygenation has continued, as well as other projects and collaborations including work on proton accelerators. The institute remained at Mount Vernon Hospital until 2008 when it relocated to Oxford after the Gray Laboratory Cancer Research Trust became a wholly owned subsidiary of the University.

Original building of the British Empire Cancer Campaign Research Unit in Radiobiology 1956
