= Mount Vernon Hospital =

- The Hillingdon Hospitals NHS Foundation Trust
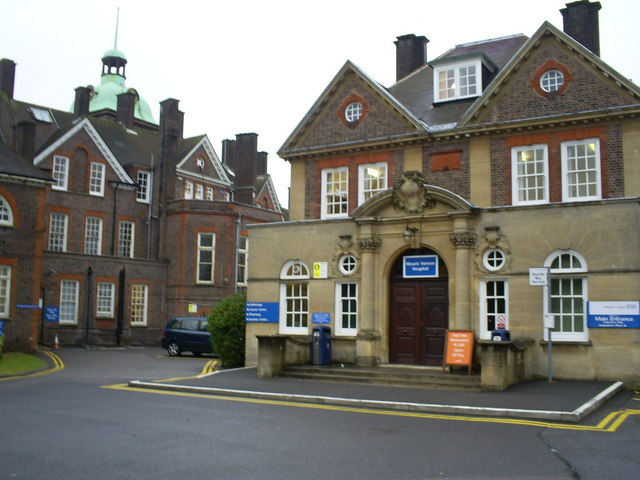
- The main entrance to Mount Vernon Hospital

- Shown in Hillingdon

Geography
- Location: Northwood, London, England
- Coordinates: 51.6168°N 0.4447°W

Organisation
- Care system: National Health Service
- Type: Specialist
- Affiliated university: Brunel University of London; Imperial College London

Services
- Emergency department: No
- Beds: 300

History
- Founded: 1860; 166 years ago September 1904; 122 years ago (current site)

Links
- Website: thh.nhs.uk/mount-vernon-hospital/

Mount Vernon Hospital, founded as the North London Hospital for Consumption and Diseases of the Chest in 1860, is a hospital located in Northwood in the London Borough of Hillingdon. It is one of two hospitals run by The Hillingdon Hospitals NHS Foundation Trust, the other being Hillingdon Hospital.

== History ==
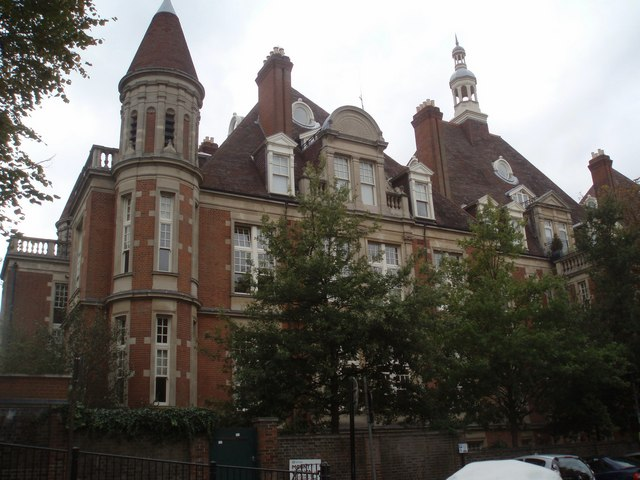
Mount Vernon House, the former hospital in Hampstead

The hospital was founded as the North London Hospital for Consumption and Diseases of the Chest in a mansion in Hampstead High Street in 1860. A central London out-patients department opened in the Tottenham Court Road in 1861. In October 1880 Prince Arthur, Duke of Connaught and Strathearn laid the foundation stone for a purpose-built hospital at Mount Vernon in Hampstead. The hospital, which was built in the French Renaissance style, was completed in 1881. The adjacent Mount Vernon House served as the residence of the Hospital Seceretary and from 1903 as the hospital's Nurses' Home. Meanwhile the Central London out-patients department moved from Tottenham Court Road to Fitzroy Square in 1891.

In 1901 it was decided to build a more-modern facility on part of the Northwood Park Estate in Northwood, London. The foundation stone was laid by Princess Helena the following year. The hospital, which was designed by Frederick Wheeler, was arranged as a sanatorium with the wards following a semi-circle shape either side of a central staircase. The new Mount Vernon Hospital opened in September 1904 and the old Hampstead building was then acquired and occupied by the Medical Research Council's National Institute for Medical Research.

During the First World War, soldiers were treated at the Mount Vernon Hospital and, in 1932, the Central London out-patients department moved to Riding House Street. At the outbreak of the Second World War Mount Vernon became a general hospital dealing, inter alia, with war casualties. In 1947 the central London out patients department moved to Portland Place and, in 1948, the hospital joined the National Health Service.

In 1957, the Gray Laboratory was established and, in 1967, the Marie Curie Hospital, which had been providing cancer treatment from premises in Fitzjohn's Avenue, also moved to Mount Vernon site.

The Paul Strickland Scanner Centre, which provides specialist imaging facilities using high quality equipment, opened in 1985 and was officially opened by the Duchess of Kent on 20 March 1986. The old hospital chapel which includes art nouveau designs, was converted into a library for the Gray Cancer Institute in 1988. The Lynda Jackson Macmillan Centre for cancer support and information was opened in 1993 by Charles III – then Prince of Wales.

In 2009 a new treatment centre opened, providing surgery facilities in four new operating theatres. There is also a new outpatients department located in the treatment centre.

== Mount Vernon Cancer Centre ==
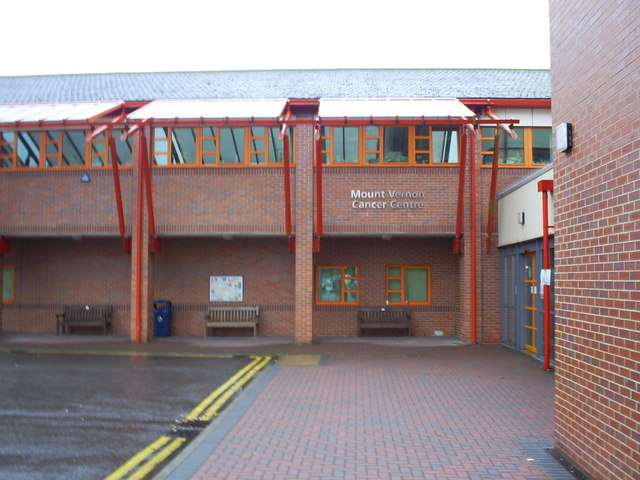
The Cancer Centre at Mount Vernon, opened in 2009

The cancer centre is run by East and North Hertfordshire Teaching NHS Trust. In October 2019 a group of experts reported to health leaders that, due to dilapidated buildings, obsolete equipment and a lack of staff, patients were unsafe and the quality of care was uncertain. It was initially planned to be taken over by University College London Hospitals NHS Foundation Trust in April 2021. In 2021, plans were announced to move the cancer treatment centre to Watford General Hospital, subject to funding.

== Transport ==
The nearest tube station to the hospital is at Northwood, which is served by the Metropolitan line. Five buses serve Mount Vernon Hospital, three of which are London bus routes. These routes are:

- 508 (towards Hemel Hempstead, via South Oxhey and Watford)
- 282 (TfL, towards Ealing Hospital)
- 331 (TfL, towards Ruislip and Uxbridge)
- H11 (TfL, towards Harrow)
- R1/R2 (towards Uxbridge twice per day, otherwise terminating at Maple Cross) The hospital used to have No. 8 (towards Watford), until 30 October 2022, when it was replaced with 508.

== Bibliography ==
- Bowlt, Eileen. M. (2007) Around Ruislip, Eastcote, Northwood, Ickenham & Harefield. Stroud: Sutton Publishing ISBN 978-0-7509-4796-1
