= Sun Life & Provincial Holdings =

- Type: Public
- Industry: Insurance
- Founded: 1995; 31 years ago
- Defunct: 2000; 26 years ago
- Fate: Acquired
- Successor: Axa Group
- Headquarters: London, UK
- Key people: Lord Douro, (Chairman)

Sun Life & Provincial Holdings plc was a large British insurance company. It was listed on the London Stock Exchange and was a constituent of the FTSE 100 Index. It was acquired by French insurance company Axa Group in 1996.

== History ==
The company was established in 1995 as a holding company for the Sun Life Assurance Society and the Provincial Insurance Company in both of which Union des Assurances de Paris (UAP) of France had acquired substantial holdings.

=== Sun Life Assurance Society ===
The Sun Life Assurance Society was a life insurance offshoot, founded in 1810, of the Sun Fire Office. The Head Office moved to Bristol in 1976. UAP acquired 50% of the Sun Life Assurance Society in 1992.

=== Provincial Insurance Company ===
The Provincial Insurance Company was founded by Sir James Scott in Manchester in 1903. The company moved its head office to Kendal in 1918. UAP acquired the Provincial Insurance Company for £300m in 1994.

=== Axa increases its shareholding ===
In 1997 Axa, who had acquired UAP in 1996, transferred its Equity & Law business into the company thereby increasing its holding in the company from 60% to 72%. Then in May 2000 Axa acquired all shares it did not already own in the company.
