= DVH =

DVH may refer to:

- Darent Valley Hospital, an acute district general hospital in Dartford, Kent, England
- Desert Valley Hospital, in Victorville, San Bernardino County, California, USA
- Dose-volume histogram, in radiation therapy
- Double V-hull Stryker, an eight-wheeled armored fighting vehicle
- Dove Holes railway station, Derbyshire, England (National Rail station code)

== See also ==
- DVHS (disambiguation)
