= 4DCT =

Type of CT scanning

Lung motion in 4DCT

Four-dimensional computed tomography (4DCT) is a type of CT scanning which records multiple images over time. It allows playback of the scan as a video, so that physiological processes can be observed and internal movement can be tracked. The name is derived from the addition of time (as the fourth dimension) to traditional 3D computed tomography. Alternatively, the phase of a particular process, such as respiration, may be considered the fourth dimension.

Fluoroscopy is a similar technique to 4DCT, however it refers to the introduction of a time element to 2D planar radiography, rather than to 3D CT.

== Applications ==
=== Radiotherapy ===
4DCT is used in radiation therapy planning to reduce doses to healthy organs such as the heart or lungs. Most radiation therapy is planned using the results of a 3D CT scan. A 3D scan largely presents a snapshot of the body at a particular point in time, however due to the time of the acquisition, in which the patient is likely to have moved in some way (even if only breathing), there will be an element of blurring or averaging in the 3D scan. When it comes to treatment planning, this motion can mean there is less accuracy in the positioning of treatment beams, and reduce the likelihood of a repeatable set-up on the linear accelerator when it comes to treatment.

To minimise physical movements of the patient, some sort of immobilisation is typically used. To overcome physiological motion, such as breathing, 4DCT acquires images at a range of times and positions, allowing the extent of motion to be visualised (e.g. from maximum inspiration to maximum exhalation). The treatment plan can then be designed with a knowledge of the full range of possible positions of important organs, and the tumour (target) itself.

4DCT will usually involve a gating technique, such as breathing tracking, so that image acquisition is automatically triggered at set points. This gating can also be applied at treatment, where the radiotherapy beam is only switched on at certain points in the breathing cycle (as in the deep inspiration breath-hold technique).

=== Diagnostic radiology ===
4DCT has started to be used for diagnostic radiology procedures, for example looking at joint problems, the cardiac cycle and parathyroid washout of contrast. Downsides of 4DCT for diagnostic purposes include large and complex datasets, and increased radiation dose to the patient.

== Reconstruction methods ==
4DCT aims to visualise the temporal dynamics of a 3D sample with a sufficiently high temporal and spatial resolution. Successive time frames are typically obtained by sequential scanning, followed by independent reconstruction of each 3D dataset. Such an approach requires a large number of projections for each scan to obtain images with sufficient quality (in terms of artefacts and SNR). Hence, there is a clear trade-off between the rotation speed of the gantry (i.e. time resolution) and the quality of the reconstructed images. Motion vector based Iterative Techniques are available which reconstruct a particular time frame by including the projections of neighbouring time frames as well. Such a strategy allows to improve the trade-off between the rotation speed and the SNR.

For fluid dynamics, specialized reconstruction algorithms have been developed that model the attenuation course throughout time. An example of such fluid dynamics is perfusion CT in which the propagation of contrast agent is modelled and simultaneously estimated with the CT images.
