= Surface-guided radiation therapy =

3D imaging used during radiation therapy

- Other names: SGRT / Surface-image guided radiation therapy
- Specialty: Interventional radiology/oncology
- [edit on Wikidata]

Surface-guided radiation therapy (SGRT) (sometimes referred to as Surface-image Guided Radiation Therapy) is a process which uses 3D imaging to position and track radiation therapy patients during their treatment.

== Goals and clinical benefits ==
SGRT can help to improve the safety, effectiveness and efficiency of radiation therapy treatments, by offering guidance across every step of the radiation therapy workflow, including simulation, planning, treatment and dose visualisation.

Developed as an advancement to image-guided radiation therapy, SGRT relies on 3D imaging as opposed to an x-ray. SGRT uses cameras to feed data into a software program linked to the linear accelerator delivering the radiation. Each camera uses a projector and image sensors to create a 3D surface model of a patient, by projecting a red light containing a pseudo-random speckle pattern on their skin. The pattern allows the SGRT system to reference thousands of points on the skin, acting as virtual medical tattoos. This imaging information is fed into the software to allow real-time tracking and sub-millimetric accuracy during radiotherapy treatments. Information on movements is fed back to the radiation therapist, who is alerted if the patient moves from the optimal position (as determined by their treatment plan). SGRT systems can be set to automatically stop the delivery of radiation if a patient moves outside of a certain tolerance level.

SGRT can help to reduce errors in set-up and positioning, allow the margins around target tissue when planning to be reduced, and enable treatment to be adapted during its course, with the aim of overall improving outcomes.

== Clinical applications ==
For breast cancer treatment, SGRT increases the patient setup information compared to laser‐based setup (LBS), by using the entire patient skin surface instead of only three skin marks. SGRT also enables clinicians to monitor a patient in real-time to replicate the same position during the CT scan for sarcoma patients.

When used with deep inspiratory breath-hold, SGRT supports initial positioning, both in free breathing (at mid-patient reference point) and in DIBH (at treatment isocenter). This process has been found to help reduce errors in set-up, positioning and improve overall outcomes for patients. It has also been used with Stereotactic Body Radiation Therapy to assist with the initial set-up and detect intrafraction patient motion throughout treatment. For stereotactic surgery, SGRT allows a frameless system to be used to monitor the surface of the patient within an open-face immobilization mask.

== See also ==
- Radiography
- Treatment of cancer
