= EF-5 =

EF-5 may refer to:

- 18F-EF5, a chemical compound used in oncology research
- EF5, the highest rating on the Enhanced Fujita scale of tornado strength
- Milwaukee Road class EP-1, EF-1, EF-2, EF-3, and EF-5, a type of railroad engine
