= Nanobiotix =

French healthcare company

- Traded as: Euronext Paris: NANO; CAC Small
- Industry: Biotechnology
- Founded: 2003
- Headquarters: Paris, France
- Key people: Laurent Levy ( CEO)
- Products: NBTXR3 (Hensify®)
- Operating income: €2.54 million (2019)
- Total assets: €54.9 million (2019)
- Number of employees: 110 (2020)
- Website: www.nanobiotix.com

Nanobiotix is a biotechnology company that uses nanomedicine to develop new radiotherapy techniques for cancer patients. The company is headquartered in Paris, with additional corporate offices in New York and Massachusetts.

== History ==
Nanobiotix is a spin-off of the State University of New York (SUNY) at Buffalo that was incorporated in 2003 and has been primarily funded by leading European venture capital firms (Matignon Technologies, OTC Asset Management, Cap Decisif, Amorcage Rhone-Alpes, CIC Vizille; Masseran Gestion-CGE).

Nanobiotix, founded in 2003 based on research by Laurent Levy at SUNY Buffalo. Between 2007 and 2010, the company focused on the development of the NanoXray research program. In 2011, Nanobiotix initiated its first Phase I/II clinical study on NBTXR3 in humans, marking the commencement of treatment for the first patient in the study.

The company went public in 2012, listing on the Euronext Paris market and establishing a partnership with PharmaEngine. By 2014, Nanobiotix expanded its presence to the United States with the creation of its first US subsidiary in Cambridge, Massachusetts. In 2015, the company started its first clinical trial in the United States, targeting prostate cancer with NBTXR3.

In 2017, Nanobiotix opened a new facility to expand its manufacturing capabilities, increase production capacity, and prepare for commercialization. The same year, the FDA approved Nanobiotix's first immuno-oncology trial in the US, and the company opened two new affiliates in Germany and Spain.

Positive Phase II/III results for NBTXR3 in soft tissue sarcoma were reported in 2018. In 2019, Nanobiotix launched nine new Phase I/II clinical trials treating six cancer indications and involving 340 patients at the University of Texas MD Anderson Cancer Center. The company also received European market approval (CE marking) for NBTXR3 (Hensify®) for the treatment of locally advanced soft tissue sarcoma. Additionally, Nanobiotix established a new subsidiary, Curadigm, aimed at optimizing therapeutic balance across the pharmaceutical industry, and was awarded the 2019 Prix Galien Award for NBTXR3.

In 2020, the U.S. FDA granted Fast Track designation for the investigation of NBTXR3 in head and neck cancer.

== Therapeutics ==
Nanobiotix is currently in the clinical stage of developing NBTXR3, a “radioenhancer” that uses nanotechnology to make cancer cells more receptive to radiotherapy. NBTXR3 is an aqueous suspension of crystalline metallic nanoparticles approximately 50 nanometers in diameter, designed for injection directly into a malignant tumor. When exposed to ionizing radiation, NBTXR3 amplifies the localized, intratumoral killing effect. Upon activation by a standard dose of radiation, they release free radicals that destroys cancer cells, whilst the surrounding healthy tissues are preserved and receive the same dose of radiation as in standard radiotherapy. The product is designed to enhance the overall efficacy of radiotherapy without resulting in additional side effects.

== Clinical Trials ==
NBTXR3 is currently being evaluated in 7 clinical trials around the world, and the development plan will include 16 clinical trials in 8 different types of cancer. In 2019, Nanobiotix launched a clinical collaboration with MD Anderson that includes 9 new Phase I/II clinical trials will be launched in the United States for NBTXR3 in multiple indications, including head and neck, pancreatic, lung, esophageal, and colorectal cancers.

Nanobiotix obtained the first European marketing authorization (CE marking) for Hensify, the commercial name of NBTXR3, for the treatment of locally advanced Soft Tissue Sarcoma.

=== Soft Tissue Sarcoma ===
Soft tissue sarcomas (STSs) are a rare type of cancer that develops in different types of soft tissues, including muscles, joint structures, fat, nerves and blood vessels. Although STS can develop at any anatomic site, it occurs in the extremities (arms and legs) in approximately 60% of cases. NBTXR3 completed Phase II/III clinical trials to treat Soft tissue sarcomas in combination with radiotherapy and surgery in April 2020.

=== Head and Neck Cancer ===
Chemotherapy in combination with radiation is the standard treatment for locally advanced head and neck cancers in both the United States of America and the European Union. However, such treatment cannot usually be proposed to elderly and frail patients, as they are unable to endure the physical strain inherent in chemotherapy treatment.

NBTXR3 is currently in Phase II/III clinical trials to increase radiotherapy’s efficacy at treating Head and neck cancer. As of 2020, the study is recruiting participants in Taiwan.

=== Hepatocellular carcinoma and liver metastases ===
According to the World Health Organization, liver cancer is currently the fourth most common cause of cancer death in the world. Surgical resection cannot be performed on many patients, while local and systemic treatment options are few in number and have significant limitations. Radiotherapy has been shown to improve outcomes for these patients, as a direct correlation between higher doses of radiation and increased survival rates have been observed from third party clinical trials. NBTXR3 is currently in Phase I/II clinical trials to increase radiotherapy’s efficacy at treating liver cancer. As of 2020, the study is recruiting participants in France.

=== Rectal Cancer ===
Colorectal cancer is the third most common cancer in men and the second most common cancer in women. The five-year survival rate for patients with Rectal cancer is 64.4%, but varies greatly depending on the stage of the cancer and whether the cancer has spread.4NBTXR3 is currently in Phase I/II clinical trials to increase radiotherapy’s efficacy at treating rectal cancer. As of 2020, the study is recruiting participants in Taiwan.

=== NBTXR3 in combination with immune checkpoint inhibitors ===
The NANORAY-1100 study is a multicenter, multi-arm, that aims to evaluate the safety, efficacy, and tolerability of NBTXR3 activated by radiotherapy in combination with anti-PD-1 therapy in Locoregional recurrent (LRR) or recurrent and metastatic (R/M) head and neck squamous-cell carcinoma (HNSCC) and lung and Liver metastasis. It aims to evaluate the hypothesis that the combination of NBTXR3 activated by RT with anti-PD-1 therapy will act synergistically to enhance the therapeutic window of radiation therapy by maximizing the local effect, overcoming radio-resistance, increasing the efficacy of immunotherapy, and potentially producing an abscopal effect for improved distant tumor control. As of 2020, the study is recruiting participants in several states in the United States.

== Corporate structure ==
As of 2022:

- Chief executive officer: Laurent Levy
- Chairman of the Board: Gary Phillips
- Chief financial officer: Bart van Rhijn
- Chief people officer (Chief human resources officer): Anne-Juliette Hermant
- CEO Nanobiotix USA & Global Head of Business Development (CEO, United States): Patrick Tricoli

== Research and development ==
Nanobiotix has already won 10 public and private awards and owns 9 original umbrella patents.

In the pipeline it has: NBTXR3, (a radiosensitizer), composed of hafnium oxide nanoparticles. Has an IND for a cancer trial (in combination with a PD-1 inhibitor). Other clinical trials include : a Phase II/III in soft tissue sarcoma of the extremity and trunk wall, a Phase I/II for hepatocellular carcinoma, a Phase I/II for prostate cancer, and a Phase I for squamous cell carcinoma of the oral cavity.
