= Laurent Levy =

French Scientist and Entrepreneur

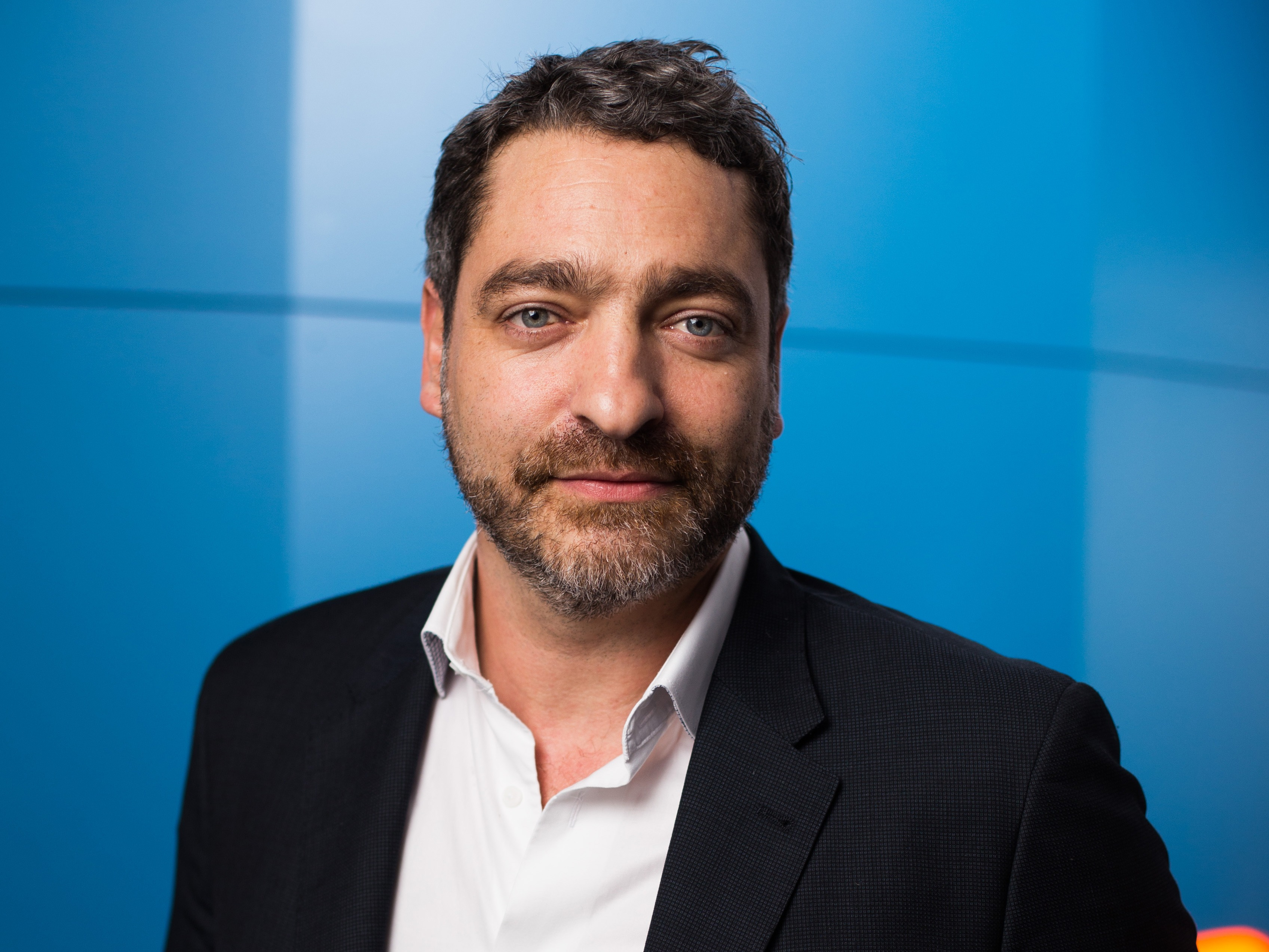
- Born: 1971 (age 54–55); Montreuil, France
- Education: Pierre and Marie Curie University, now Paris-Sorbonne University (BS, MS); SUNY Buffalo (PhD)
- Occupation: CEO of Nanobiotix

Laurent Levy (born 1971) is a French physical chemist, inventor, and pioneer of nanotechnology and nanomedicine. He is the co-founder of the global biotechnology company Nanobiotix, and has been chief executive officer (CEO) since its inception in March 2003. He has authored more than 35 international scientific publications and applied for several patents.

== Early life and education ==
Laurent Levy was born on the outskirts of northern-east Paris, in Montreuil.

After high school, Laurent went on to study biology at Pierre and Marie Curie University (Paris VI). He changed his area of study to biophysics then to physics and chemistry after two years, graduating with his bachelor's degree in 1994. He then earned his master's degree (DEA) in physics of condensed matter from UPVI-ESPCI.

Laurent attended Paris VI and the CEA for doctoral studies in physical chemistry, specializing in nanomaterials. His doctoral thesis centered on quantum confinement as it relates to magnetic semiconductors.

Following the receipt of his doctorate, Levy completed a postdoctoral fellowship with Paras N. Prasad at the Institute for Lasers, Photonics, and Biophotonics at SUNY Buffalo in the United States.

== Work ==
In 2003, Levy founded Nanobiotix to create a medical treatment using the techniques he developed at SUNY Buffalo. Nanobiotix would build on his work to develop what is now known as NBTXR3, a first-in-class “radioenhancer” designed to significantly increase the efficacy of radiation therapy without increasing negative side effects associated with radiation. In 2011, Nanobiotix treated its first patient using NBTXR3. In 2018 the results of a phase III clinical trial established that this new type of product could work in humans. In 2019 the company received approval to sell NBTXR3 in Europe under the brand name Hensify® for the treatment of soft tissue sarcomas of the extremities and trunk wall. In 2015 Levy joined the board of biotech startup Valbiotis, the first company to register a nutraceutical based on clinical findings. The company develops nutraceutical products for the prevention of diabetes in pre-diabetics. Levy helped take Valbiotis public in 2018.

In 2019, Levy co-founded the biotechnology company Curadigm as a spin-off from Nanobiotix. Curadigm's lead technology is a nanoprimer that affects liver function, reducing its ability to filter out drugs, making drug delivery more efficacious.

== European nanomedicine advocacy ==
As Nanobiotix grew, Levy became increasingly frustrated at the struggles nanomedicine companies faced in gaining visibility and support in the European Union. To advocate for nanomedical development, Levy joined the European Technology Platform Nanomedicine (ETPN) in 2012 and was elected vice president. Levy is a founding member of the ETPN Translation Advisory Board, which has supported 109 European biotech entrepreneurs in launching their companies. Levy also helped to establish the ETPN's Nanomedicine Translation Hub, which advises SMEs, Startups, Academics and Inventors on how to bring their nanomedicine projects to the market.

== Awards and recognition ==
- 2019 Prix Galien
- 2018
  - CPhI Pharma Award - Excellence in Pharma: CEO of the year Laurent Levy
  - CPhI Pharma Award - Pharma Company of the year : Nanobiotix
  - European Business Award 2018 : The award for Innovation
- 2016 European Mediscience Award: Best technology Award
- 2015 Prix de la relation actionnaires
- 2013 University of Buffalo Young Entrepreneurs Prize : Laurent Levy
- 2006 Paris Bio Prize
- 2003 Inventor of the year: Niagara frontier intellectual property law association

== Publications ==
- Levy, Laurent; Sahoo, Yudhisthira; Kim, Kyoung-Soo; Bergey, Earl J.; Prasad, Paras N. (2002). "Nanochemistry: Synthesis and Characterization of Multifunctional Nanoclinics for Biological Applications". Chemistry of Materials. 14 (9). American Chemical Society (ACS): 3715–3721. doi:10.1021/cm0203013. ISSN 0897-4756.
- Maggiorella, Laurence; Barouch, Gilles; Devaux, Corinne; Pottier, Agnès; Deutsch, Eric; Bourhis, Jean; Borghi, Elsa; Levy, Laurent (2012). "Nanoscale radiotherapy with hafnium oxide nanoparticles". Future Oncology. 8 (9). Future Medicine Ltd: 1167–1181. doi:10.2217/fon.12.96. ISSN 1479-6694. PMID 23030491.
- Bergey, Earl J.; Levy, Laurent; Wang, Xiaopeng; Krebs, Linda J.; Lal, Manjari; Kim, Kyoung-Soo; Pakatchi, Shadi; Liebow, Charles; Prasad, Paras N. (2002). "DC Magnetic Field Induced Magnetocytolysis of Cancer Cells Targeted by LH-RH Magnetic Nanoparticles in vitro". Biomedical Microdevices. 4 (4). Springer Science and Business Media LLC: 293–299. doi:10.1023/a:1020906307053. ISSN 1387-2176. S2CID 134380514.
