= Etanidazole =

Names
- Preferred IUPAC name N-(2-Hydroxyethyl)-2-(2-nitro-1H-imidazol-1-yl)acetamide

Identifiers
CAS Number	22668-01-5
3D model (JSmol)	Interactive image
ChEMBL	ChEMBL47405
ChemSpider	3161
DrugBank	DB12736
ECHA InfoCard	100.164.363
PubChem CID	3276
UNII	30DKA3Q1HL
CompTox Dashboard (EPA)	DTXSID8045434
- InChI: InChI=1S/C7H10N4O4/c12-4-2-8-6(13)5-10-3-1-9-7(10)11(14)15/h1,3,12H,2,4-5H2,(H,8,13) Key: WCDWBPCFGJXFJZ-UHFFFAOYSA-N
- SMILES: O=[N+]([O-])c1nccn1CC(=O)NCCO

Properties
Chemical formula	C_{7}H_{10}N_{4}O_{4}
Molar mass	214.181 g·mol^{−1}
- Except where otherwise noted, data are given for materials in their standard state (at 25 °C [77 °F], 100 kPa). verify (what is ?) Infobox references

Etanidazole is a nitroimidazole drug that was investigated in clinical trials for its radiosensitizing properties in cancer treatment. Administration of etanidazole results in a decrease of glutathione concentration and inhibits glutathione S-transferase. The result is that tissues become more sensitive to the ionizing radiation.

== See also ==
- 18F-EF5, a related nitroimidazole
- Misonidazole
