= DVHS =

DVHS may refer to:

- D-VHS, digital video system
- Del Valle High School (El Paso, Texas)
- Del Valle High School (Travis County, Texas)
- Deer Valley High School (Glendale, Arizona)
- Delaware Valley High School (public school)
- Delaware Valley High School (private school)
- Desert Vista High School
- Dougherty Valley High School
- Leonardo da Vinci High School
