= Multileaf collimator =

MLC shape of an X-MLCs

A multileaf collimator (MLC) is a collimator or beam-limiting device that is made of individual "leaves" of a high atomic numbered material, usually tungsten, that can move independently in and out of the path of a radiotherapy beam in order to shape it and vary its intensity.

MLCs are used in external beam radiotherapy to provide conformal shaping of beams. Specifically, conformal radiotherapy and Intensity Modulated Radiation Therapy (IMRT) can be delivered using MLCs.

The MLC has improved rapidly since its inception and the first use of leaves to shape structures in 1965 to modern day operation and use. MLCs are now widely used and have become an integral part of any radiotherapy department. MLCs were primarily used for conformal radiotherapy, and have allowed the cost-effective implementation of conformal treatment with significant time saving, and also have been adapted for use for IMRT treatments. For conformal radiotherapy the MLC allows conformal shaping of the beam to match the borders of the target tumour. For intensity modulated treatments the leaves of a MLC can be moved across the field to create IMRT distributions (MLCs really provide a fluence modulation rather than intensity modulation).

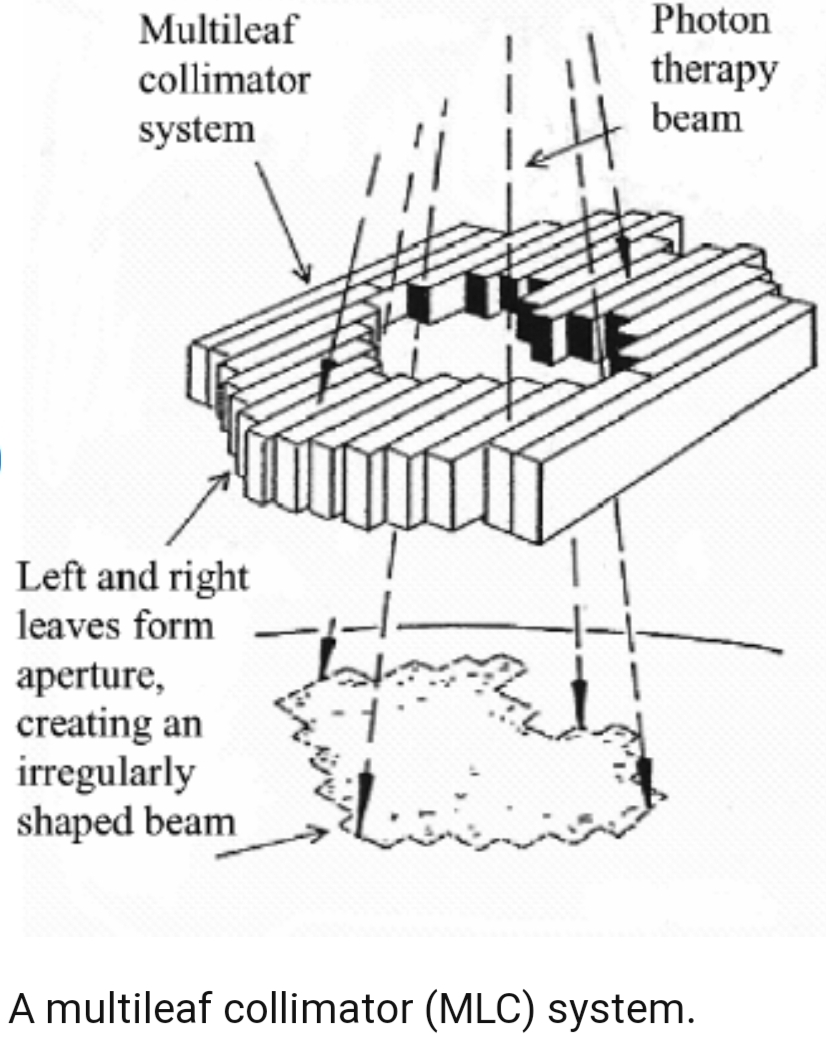
Leaves, changing shape, direct the beam to the right cancer area

The MLC is an important tool for radiation therapy dose delivery. It was originally used as a surrogate for alloy block field shaping and is now widely used for IMRT. As with any tool used in radiotherapy the MLC must undergo commissioning and quality assurance. Additional commissioning measurements are completed to model a MLC for treatment planning. Various MLCs are provided by different vendors and they all have unique design features as determined by specifications of design, and these differences are quite significant.
