= Plesiotherapy =

Plesiotherapy is a radiation therapy modality in which a source of ionizing radiation is placed in contact with the exterior surface of the body.

This is as distinguished from teletherapy in which radiation is projected by the source from a distance, from brachytherapy in which one or more sealed sources of radiation are placed inside the body, and from radiopharmaceutical therapy in which a source is introduced into the body, but that source is unsealed.

In contrast with teletherapy, where the distance between the source and the patient is exploited to produce a shallow fall-off of beam intensity with depth; in plesiotherapy, the source geometry is exploited to produce a dose fall-off that is steep, for treating superficial areas.

One example of plesiotherapy is use of the ^{90}Sr eye applicator in the treatment of pterygium.
