= Misonidazole =

Names
- IUPAC name (RS)-1-Methoxy-3-(2-nitroimidazol-1-yl)propan-2-ol

Identifiers
CAS Number	13551-87-6
3D model (JSmol)	Interactive image
ChEMBL	ChEMBL42161
ChemSpider	24317
ECHA InfoCard	100.033.559
EC Number	236-931-6
KEGG	D05052
MeSH	D008920
PubChem CID	26105
UNII	8FE7LTN8XE
CompTox Dashboard (EPA)	DTXSID80864420
- InChI: InChI=1S/C7H11N3O4/c1-14-5-6(11)4-9-3-2-8-7(9)10(12)13/h2-3,6,11H,4-5H2,1H3 Key: OBBCSXFCDPPXOL-UHFFFAOYSA-N; InChI=1/C7H11N3O4/c1-14-5-6(11)4-9-3-2-8-7(9)10(12)13/h2-3,6,11H,4-5H2,1H3 Key: OBBCSXFCDPPXOL-UHFFFAOYAQ
- SMILES: COCC(CN1C=CN=C1[N+](=O)[O-])O

Properties
Chemical formula	C_{7}H_{11}N_{3}O_{4}
Molar mass	201.182 g·mol^{−1}
- Except where otherwise noted, data are given for materials in their standard state (at 25 °C [77 °F], 100 kPa). verify (what is ?) Infobox references

Misonidazole is a radiosensitizer that was investigated in clinical trials. It was used in these trials for radiation therapy to cause normally resistant hypoxic tumor cells to become sensitive to the treatment.

== See also ==
- Etanidazole
