= Image-guided radiation therapy =

- Other names: IGRT
- Specialty: Interventional radiology, oncology

Image-guided radiation therapy (IGRT) is the process of frequent imaging, during a course of radiation treatment, used to direct the treatment, position the patient, and compare to the pre-therapy imaging from the treatment plan. Immediately prior to, or during, a treatment fraction, the patient is localized in the treatment room in the same position as planned from the reference imaging dataset. An example of IGRT would include comparison of a cone beam computed tomography (CBCT) dataset, acquired on the treatment machine, with the computed tomography (CT) dataset from planning. IGRT would also include matching planar kilovoltage (kV) radiographs or megavoltage (MV) images with digital reconstructed radiographs (DRRs) from the planning CT.

This process is distinct from the use of imaging to delineate targets and organs in the planning process of radiation therapy. However, there is a connection between the imaging processes as IGRT relies directly on the imaging modalities from planning as the reference coordinates for localizing the patient. The variety of medical imaging technologies used in planning includes x-ray computed tomography (CT), magnetic resonance imaging (MRI), and positron emission tomography (PET) among others.

IGRT can help to reduce errors in set-up and positioning, allow the margins around target tissue when planning to be reduced, and enable treatment to be adapted during its course, with the aim of overall improving outcomes.

== Goals and clinical benefits ==
The goal of the IGRT process is to improve the accuracy of the radiation field placement, and to reduce the exposure of healthy tissue during radiation treatments. In years past, larger planning target volume (PTV) margins were used to compensate for localization errors during treatment. This resulted in healthy human tissues receiving unnecessary doses of radiation during treatment. PTV margins are the most widely used method to account for geometric uncertainties. By improving accuracy through IGRT, radiation is decreased to surrounding healthy tissues, allowing for increased radiation to the tumour for control.

Currently, certain radiation therapy techniques employ the process of intensity-modulated radiotherapy (IMRT). This form of radiation treatment uses computers and linear accelerators to sculpt a three-dimensional radiation dose map, specific to the target's location, shape and motion characteristics. Because of the level of precision required for IMRT, detailed data must be gathered about tumour locations. The single most important area of innovation in clinical practice is the reduction of the planning target volume margins around the location. The ability to avoid more normal tissue (and thus potentially employ dose escalation strategies) is a direct by-product of the ability to execute therapy with the most accuracy.

Modern radiotherapy techniques such as proton and charged particle radiotherapy enable higher precision in the dose delivery and spatial distribution of the effective dose. Today, those possibilities add new challenges to IGRT, concerning required accuracy and reliability. Suitable approaches are therefore a matter of intense research.

IGRT increases the amount of data collected throughout the course of therapy. Over the course of time, whether for an individual or a population of patients, this information will allow for the continued assessment and further refinement of treatment techniques. The clinical benefit for the patient is the ability to monitor and adapt to changes that may occur during the course of radiation treatment. Such changes can include tumor shrinkage or expansion, or changes in shape of the tumor and surrounding anatomy.

The precision of IGRT is significantly improved when technologies that were originally developed for image-guided surgery, such as the N-localizer and Sturm-Pastyr localizer, are used in conjunction with these medical imaging technologies.

== Rationale ==
Radiation therapy is a local treatment that is designed to treat the defined tumour and spare the surrounding normal tissue from receiving doses above specified dose tolerances. There are many factors that may contribute to differences between the planned dose distribution and the delivered dose distribution. One such factor is uncertainty in patient position on the treatment unit. IGRT is a component of the radiation therapy process that incorporates imaging coordinates from the treatment plan to be delivered in order to ensure the patient is properly aligned in the treatment room.

The localization information provided through IGRT approaches can also be used to facilitate robust treatment planning strategies and enable patient modelling, which is beyond the scope of this article.

== History of "guidance" for treatment ==
=== Surface and skin marks ===
In general, at the time of 'planning' (whether a clinical mark up or a full simulation) the intended area for treatment is outlined by the radiation oncologist. Once the area of treatment was determined, marks were placed on the skin. The purpose of the ink marks was to align and position the patient daily for treatment to improve reproducibility of field placement. By aligning the markings with the radiation field (or its representation) in the radiation therapy treatment room, the correct placement of the treatment field could be identified.

Over time, with improvement in technology – light fields with cross hairs, isocentric lasers – and with the shift to the practice of 'tattooing' – a procedure where ink markings are replaced with a permanent mark by the application of ink just under the first layer of skin using a needle in documented locations - the reproducibility of the patient's setup improved.

=== Portal imaging ===
Portal imaging is the acquisition of images using a radiation beam that is being used for giving radiation treatment to a patient. If not all of the radiation beam is absorbed or scattered in the patient, the portion that passes through may be measured and used to produce images of the patient.

It is difficult to establish the initial use of portal imaging to define radiation field placement. From the early days of radiation therapy, X-rays or gamma rays were used to develop large format radiographic films for inspection. With the introduction of cobalt-60 machines in the 1950s, radiation went deeper inside the body, but with lower contrast and poor subjective visibility. Today, using advancements in digital imaging devices, the use of electronic portal imaging has developed into both a tool for accurate field placement and as a quality assurance tool for review by radiation therapists, technicians, physicists or radiation oncologists during check film reviews.

=== Electronic portal imaging ===
Electronic portal imaging is the process of using digital imaging, such as a CCD video camera, liquid ion chamber and amorphous silicon flat panel detectors to create a digital image with improved quality and contrast over traditional portal imaging. The benefit of the system is the ability to capture images, for review and guidance, digitally. These systems are in use throughout clinical practice. Current reviews of Electronic Portal Imaging Devices (EPID) show acceptable results in imaging irradiations and in most clinical practice, provide sufficiently large fields-of-view. kV is not a portal imaging feature.

== Imaging for treatment guidance ==
=== Fluoroscopy ===
Fluoroscopy is an imaging technique that uses a fluoroscope, in coordination with either a screen or image-capturing device to create real-time images of patients' internal structures.

=== Digital X-ray ===
Digital X-ray equipment mounted in the radiation treatment device is often used to picture the patient's internal anatomy at time before or during treatment, which then can be compared to the original planning CT series. Usage of an orthogonal set-up of two radiographic axes is common, to provide means for highly accurate patient position verification.

=== Computed tomography (CT) ===
A medical imaging method employing tomography where digital geometry processing is used to generate a three-dimensional image of the internal structures of an object from a large series of two-dimensional X-ray images taken around a single axis of rotation. CT produces a volume of data, which can be manipulated, through a process known as windowing, in order to demonstrate various structures based on their ability to attenuate and prevent transmission of the incident X-ray beam.

=== Conventional CT ===
With the growing recognition of the utility of CT imaging in using guidance strategies to match treatment volume position and treatment field placement, several systems have been designed that place an actual conventional 2-D CT machine in the treatment room alongside the treatment linear accelerator. The advantage is that the conventional CT provides accurate measure of tissue attenuation, which is important for dose calculation (e.g. CT on rails).

=== Cone beam ===
Cone-beam computed tomography (CBCT) based image guided systems have been integrated with medical linear accelerators to great success. With improvements in flat-panel technology, CBCT has been able to provide volumetric imaging, and allows for radiographic or fluoroscopic monitoring throughout the treatment process. Cone beam CT acquires many projections over the entire volume of interest in each projection. Using reconstruction strategies pioneered by Feldkamp, the 2D projections are reconstructed into a 3D volume analogous to the CT planning dataset.

=== MVCT ===
Megavoltage computed tomography (MVCT) is a medical imaging technique that uses the Megavoltage range of X-rays to create an image of bony structures or surrogate structures within the body. The original rational for MVCT was spurred by the need for accurate density estimates for treatment planning. Both patient and target structure localization were secondary uses. A test unit using a single linear detector, consisting of 75 cadmium tungstate crystals, was mounted on the linear accelerator gantry. The test results indicated a spatial resolution of .5mm, and a contrast resolution of 5% using this method. While another approach could involve integrating the system directly into the MLA, it would limit the number of revolutions to a number prohibitive to regular use.

=== Optical tracking ===
Optical tracking entails the use of a camera to relay positional information of objects within its inherent coordinate system by means of a subset of the electromagnetic spectrum of wavelengths spanning ultra-violet, visible, and infrared light. Optical navigation has been in use for the last 10 years within image-guided surgery (neurosurgery, ENT, and orthopaedic) and has increased in prevalence within radiotherapy to provide real-time feedback through visual cues on graphical user interfaces (GUIs). For the latter, a method of calibration is used to align the camera's native coordinate system with that of the isocentric reference frame of the radiation treatment delivery room. Optically tracked tools are then used to identify the positions of patient reference set-up points and these are compared to their location within the planning CT coordinate system. A computation based on least-squares methodology is performed using these two sets of coordinates to determine a treatment couch translation that will result in the alignment of the patient's planned isocenter with that of the treatment room. These tools can also be used for intra-fraction monitoring of patient position by placing an optically tracked tool on a region of interest to either initiate radiation delivery (i.e. gating regimes) or action (i.e. repositioning). Alternatively, products such as AlignRT (from Vision RT) allow for real time feedback by imaging the patient directly and tracking the skin surface of the patient.

=== MRI ===
The first clinically active MRI-guided radiation therapy machine, the ViewRay device, was installed in St. Louis, MO, at the Alvin J. Siteman Cancer Center at Barnes-Jewish Hospital and Washington University School of Medicine. Treatment of the first patients was announced in February 2014. Other radiation therapy machines which incorporate real-time MRI tracking of tumors are currently in development. MRI-guided radiation therapy enables clinicians, radiation therapists and technologists to see a patient's internal anatomy in real-time using continual soft-tissue imaging and allows them to keep the radiation beams on target when the tumour moves during treatment. Despite these advances, one systematic review highlights that there is limited evidence for improved clinical outcomes across different cancers and research gaps remain.

=== Ultrasound ===
Ultrasound is used for daily patient setup. It is useful for soft tissue such as the breast and prostate. The BAT (Best Nomos) and Clarity (Elekta) systems are the two main systems currently being used. The Clarity system has been further developed to enable intra-fraction prostate motion tracking via trans-perineal imaging.

=== Electromagnetic transponders ===
While not IGRT per se, electromagnetic transponder systems seek to serve exactly the same clinical function as CBCT or kV X-ray, yet provide for more temporally continuous analysis of setup error analogous to that of the optical tracking strategies. Hence, this technology (although entailing the use of no "images") is usually classified as an IGRT approach.

== Correction strategies for patient positioning during IGRT ==
There are two basic correction strategies used while determining the most beneficial patient position and beam structure: on-line and off-line correction. Both serve their purposes in the clinical setting, and have their own merits. Generally, a combination of the both strategies is employed. Often, a patient will receive corrections to their treatment via on-line strategies during their first radiation session, and physicians make subsequent adjustments off-line during check film rounds.

=== On-line ===
The On-line strategy makes adjustment to patient and beam position during the treatment process, based on continuously updated information throughout the procedure. The on-line approach requires a high-level of integration of both software and hardware. The advantage of this strategy is a reduction in both systematic and random errors. An example is the use of a marker-based program in the treatment of prostate cancer at Princess Margaret Hospital. Gold markers are implanted into the prostate to provide a surrogate position of the gland. Prior to each day's treatment, portal imaging system results are returned. If the center of the mass has moved greater than 3mm, then the couch is readjusted and a subsequent reference image is created. Other clinics correct for any positional errors, never allowing for >1 mm error in any measured axes.

=== Off-line ===
The Off-line strategy determines the best patient position through accumulated data gathered during treatment sessions, almost always initial treatments. Physicians and staff measure the accuracy of treatment and devise treatment guidelines using information from the images. The strategy requires greater coordination than on-line strategies. However, the use of off-line strategies does reduce the risk of systematic error. The risk of random error may still persist, however.

== Future areas of study ==
- The debate between the benefits of on-line versus off-line strategies continues to be contended.
- Whether further research into biological functions and movements can create a better understanding of tumor movement in the body before, between and during treatment.
- When rules or algorithms are used, large variations in PTV margins can be reduced. Margin "recipes" are being developed that will create linear equations and algorithms that account for "normal" variations. These rules are created from a normal population, and are applied to the treatment plan off-line. Possible side effects include random errors from uniqueness of the target
- With a greater amount of data being collected, how systems must will be established for the categorizing and storing of information.

== See also ==
- Compton scattering
- Cone beam reconstruction
- CT scanner
- Cyberknife
- Fluoroscopy
- ICRU
- Medical radiography
- MRI
- Positron emission tomography (PET)
- Radiation therapy
- Surface-guided radiation therapy
