= Christopher Nutting =

British medical researcher

Christopher M. Nutting (born 5 April 1968) is a British professor of clinical oncology and medical consultant, specializing in head and neck cancers, who has helped develop intensity-modulated radiotherapy (IMRT), an advanced form of radiation therapy.

== Biography ==
Nutting received a BSc with 1st class honours in medicine and cell pathology from University College London in 1989. In 1992 he was awarded a 1st class MBBS from Middlesex Hospital at the University of London. In 2001 he received a medical doctorate (MD Res) at the Institute of Cancer Research, University of London, and he was awarded a PhD from City University London in 2012.

In 2001 he was appointed consultant clinical oncologist at London's Royal Marsden Hospital and honorary senior Lecturer in clinical oncology at the Institute of Cancer Research; in 2002 he was appointed clinical director of the head and neck unit at the Royal Marsden. and in 2003 he became national clinical lead in head and neck cancer, appointed by the Department of Health (UK) and the Cancer Services Collaborative.

In 2007 he was elected honorary faculty member at the Institute for Cancer Research. In 2009 he was appointed co-chair of the Clinical and Translational Radiotherapy and Radiobiology Working Group of the National Cancer Research Institute (NCRI), and between 2006-12 he chaired the NCRI's head and neck cancer clinical studies group (CSG). In 2021, he was appointed medical director of a new Royal Marsden private care facility in Cavendish Square, London.

In 2024 he became divisional medical director for Royal Marsden Private Care, the largest provider of private medical services in the UK.

Nutting was elected Fellow of the Academy of Medical Sciences in 2018 and Fellow of the Institute of Physics in 2019. He also served as President of the Oncology Section of the Royal Society of Medicine for the years 2020-2024.

In 2022, Nutting was appointed as a senior investigator of the National Institute for Health and Care Research (NIHR), following open competition by one of England's leading medical research organisations. This is in addition to his roles at the Royal Marsden and the Institute of Cancer Research.

== Scientific work ==
In collaboration with the Institute of Cancer Research, he and his team at the Royal Marsden Hospital have managed a series of randomised trials using IMRT aimed at reducing the potentially debilitating side-effects of radiotherapy treatment for head and neck cancers.

The research has involved four trials – PARSPORT, COSTAR, ART DECO and DARS, which is investigating whether IMRT reduces difficulty in swallowing for patients with throat cancer. Each has focussed on different cancer sites respectively to assess the impact in reducing the following principal side-effects - Xerostomia (dry mouth), hearing loss, long-term or permanent damage to the larynx and difficult in swallowing.

The beneficial outcomes in the PARSPORT trial, was instrumental in prompting the UK Department of Health to recommend IMRT to all cancer networks in the UK treating head and neck cancers.

In 2014, Nutting was instrumental in the Royal Marsden and the Institute of Cancer Research being granted Medical Research Council funding to install one of Britain's first MR Linac machines which combines two technologies for the first time – an MRI scanner to precisely locate the tumour and a linear accelerator that will accurately deliver doses of radiation even to moving tumours. The MR Linac was installed at the Royal Marsden's site in Sutton and treated its first patients in 2019.

In 2018 Nutting was elected to the Fellowship of the Academy of Medical Sciences, one of the highest accolades in medicine and he is one of the youngest recipients of the award.

== HPV Campaign ==
In 2018 Nutting played a significant role in a campaign to extend vaccinations against the human papillomavirus (HPV) to adolescent boys in the UK after girls aged 12–13 had been routinely given the immunisation via schools since 2008. The campaign was successful with the UK government announcing in July 2018 that it would introduce gender neutral vaccinations for all 12 and 13 year-olds following a recommendation from the Joint Committee on Vaccination and Immunisation (JCVI) which stated that a gender-neutral programme would be cost-effective.

== Awards ==
- Royal College of Radiologists Durrant Travelling Fellowship 1999
- British Institute of Radiology Sir Godfrey Hounsfield Lecture 2000
- ESTRO-Varian Clinical Oncology Prize 2001
- British Institute of Radiology Mackenzie Davidson Memorial Medal and Lecture 2010
- Stanley Melville Award, British Institute of Radiology, 2012
- Fellowship of the Academy of Medical Sciences, 2018
