= Beam spoiler =

A beam spoiler is a piece of material, placed into the path of the photon beam in radiotherapy. The purpose of the spoiler is to reduce the depth of the maximum radiation dosage.

== Composition ==
The beam spoiler is composed of a sheet of material which has a low atomic number, typically lucite, the thickness of which is varied according to the beam energy and the distance by which the radiation dose must be shifted.

== Action ==
As the primary photon beam passes through the plate, secondary electrons are generated. The beam exiting the spoiler is a combination of the spoiler-attenuated photons and the spoiler-generated electrons. The electron component alters the depth dose in the buildup region in a way that depends on the photon beam energy, the field size, and the distance of the spoiler from the treatment surface.
