= Dose-volume histogram =

Histogram in radiation therapy planning

A dose-volume histogram (DVH) is a histogram relating radiation dose to tissue volume in radiation therapy planning. DVHs are most commonly used as a plan evaluation tool and to compare doses from different plans or to structures. DVHs were introduced by Michael Goitein (who introduced radiation therapy concepts such as the "beam's-eye-view," "digitally reconstructed radiograph," and uncertainty/error in planning and positioning, among others) and Verhey in 1979. DVH summarizes 3D dose distributions in a graphical 2D format. In modern radiation therapy, 3D dose distributions are typically created in a computerized treatment planning system (TPS) based on a 3D reconstruction of a CT scan. The "volume" referred to in DVH analysis is a target of radiation treatment, a healthy organ nearby a target, or an arbitrary structure.

== Types ==
DVHs can be visualized in either of two ways: differential DVHs or cumulative DVHs. A DVH is created by first determining the size of the dose bins of the histogram. Bins can be of arbitrary size, 0.005 Gy, 0.2 Gy or 1 Gy for instance. The size is often a matter of tradeoff between accuracy and computational or memory cost (if we store the DVH in a database).

In a differential DVH, bar or column height indicates the volume of structure receiving a dose given by the bin. Bin doses are along the horizontal axis, and structure volumes (either percent or absolute volumes) are on the vertical. The differential DVH takes the appearance of a typical histogram. The total volume of the organ that receives a certain dose is plotted in the appropriate dose bin. This volume is determined by the total number of voxels characterized by a specified range of dosage for the organ considered. The differential DVH provides information about changes in dose within the structure considered as well as visualization of minimum and maximum dose.

The cumulative DVH is plotted with bin doses along the horizontal axis, as well. However, the column height of the first bin (e.g., [0, 1] Gy) represents the volume of structure receiving a dose greater than or equal to that dose. The column height of the second bin (e.g., (1, 2] Gy) represents the volume of structure receiving greater than or equal to that dose, etc. With very fine (small) bin sizes, the cumulative DVH takes on the appearance of a smooth line graph. The lines always slope and start from top-left to bottom-right. For a structure receiving a very homogeneous dose (100% of the volume receiving exactly 10 Gy, for example) the cumulative DVH will appear as a horizontal line at the top of the graph, at 100% volume as plotted vertically, with a vertical drop at 10 Gy on the horizontal axis.

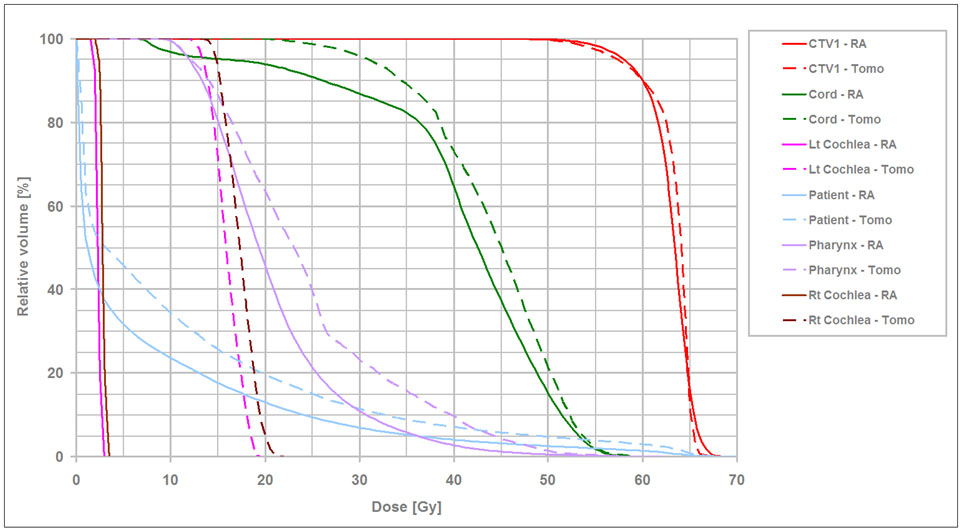
A cumulative DVH from a radiotherapy plan.

A DVH used clinically usually includes all structures and targets of interest in the radiotherapy plan, each line plotted a different color, representing a different structure. The vertical axis is almost always plotted as percent volume (rather than absolute volume), as well.

== Drawbacks ==
Clinical studies have shown that DVH metrics correlate with patient toxicity outcomes. A drawback of the DVH methodology is that it offers no spatial information; i.e., a DVH does not show where within a structure a dose is received. Also, DVHs from initial radiotherapy plans represent the doses to structures at the start of radiation treatment. As treatment progresses and time elapses, if there are changes (i.e. if patients lose weight, if tumors shrink, if organs change shape, etc.), the original DVH loses its accuracy.
