= Deep inspiration breath-hold =

Method of delivering radiotherapy

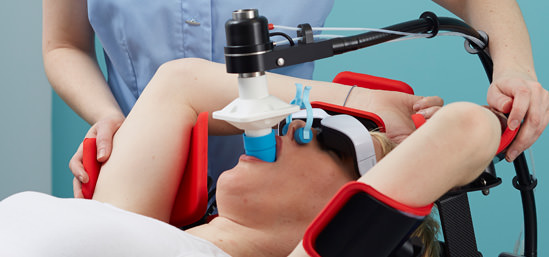
DIBH treatment

Deep inspiration breath-hold (DIBH) is a method of delivering radiotherapy while limiting radiation exposure to the heart and lungs. It is used primarily for treating left-sided breast cancer.

The technique involves a patient holding their breath during treatment. In DIBH techniques, treatment is only delivered at certain points in the breathing cycle, where the patient holds their breath. Since the relative positions of organs in the chest naturally changes during breathing, this allows treatment to be delivered to the target (tumour) while other organs are in the optimal position to receive least dose.

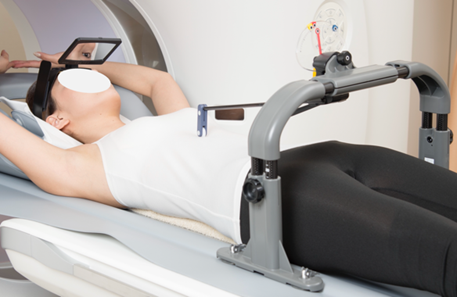
Another DIBH treatment

== Treatment Methods ==
In the DIBH technique, the patient is initially maintained at quiet tidal breathing (i.e. normal, relaxed breathing), followed by a deep inspiration, a deep expiration, a second deep inspiration, and breath-hold. At this point the patient is at approximately 100% vital capacity, and simulation, verification, and treatment take place during this phase of breath-holding. DIBH is performed with several tangential fields for left-sided breast cancer. A patient is instructed to hold the breath while viewing the breathing pattern and the breath-hold position through a head-mounted mirror, thereby ensuring reproducibility of the breath-hold position in each delivery. A pair of video goggles may also be used for monitoring the breathing cycle. Patients who cannot maintain DIBH can still benefit from lung tracking techniques, for example 4DCT.

There are two basic methods of performing DIBH: free-breathing breath-hold, and spirometry-monitored deep inspiration breath hold.

=== Free-breathing breath-hold ===
Free-breathing breath-hold, also known as real-time position management (RPM) DIBH utilises an infra-red camera and markers placed on the patient to track movement of their chest, and their breathing. Another device for DIBH is known as Abches that monitors the breathing pattern. With the Abches, a patient is instructed to hold the breath at a specified breathing position by viewing a breathing level indicator, thereby reproducing an identical breath-hold position.

=== Spirometry-monitored breath-hold ===
Spirometry based designs are known as active breathing coordinator (ABC) DIBH systems. ABC utilises a mouth piece for the patient which can be used to control the flow of air to provide more reproducible results.

== Effectiveness ==
The DIBH technique provides an advantage to conventional free-breathing treatment by decreasing lung density, reducing normal safety margins, and enabling more accurate treatment. These improvements contribute to the effective exclusion of normal lung tissue from the high-dose region and permit the use of higher treatment doses without increased risks of toxicity.

Treatment of patients with the DIBH technique is feasible in a clinical setting. With this technique, consistent lung inflation levels are achieved in patients, as judged by both spirometry and verification films. Breathing-induced tumor motion is significantly reduced using DIBH compared to free breathing, enabling better target coverage.

== Future research ==
There is currently no clear selection criteria to predict which patients will benefit most from the DIBH technique, other than left breast laterality. There is evidence to suggest parasagittal cardiac contact distance is a promising metric for selection and should be assessed in all future DIBH planning studies.
