= Delaware Valley High School (private school) =

High school in Warminster Heights, Bucks County, Pennsylvania

Coordinates: 40.19315°N 75.08642°W

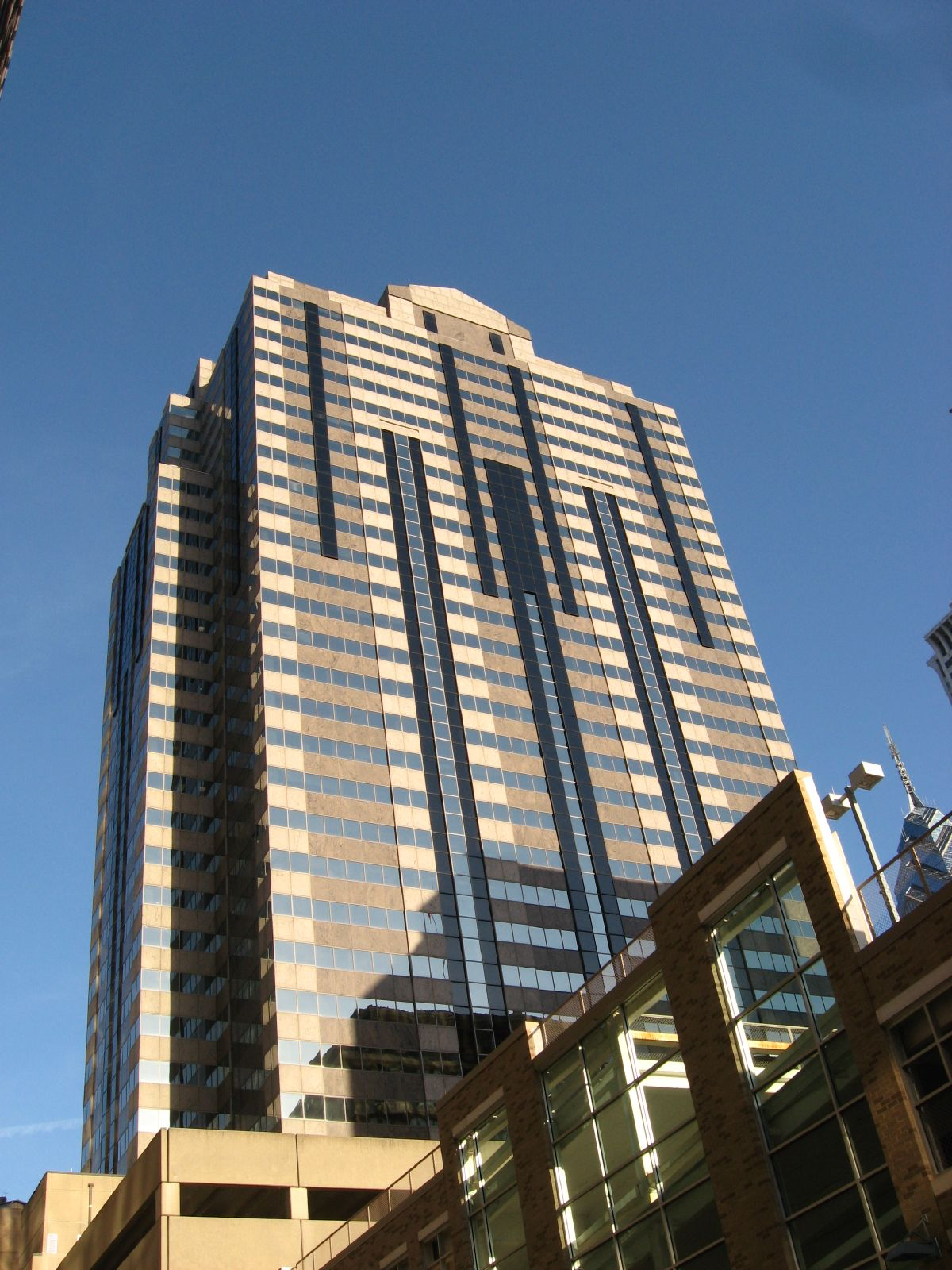
Delaware Valley High School previously had its administrative offices in Two Logan Square

Delaware Valley High School (DVHS) was a for-profit company and private school system in Greater Philadelphia.

Previously, the school system had its administrative offices in Suite 1900 at Two Logan Square in Center City Philadelphia. It operated two campuses at the time of its closing, DVHS Bucks in Warminster, Pennsylvania and DVHS Kelly in Northwest Philadelphia.

As of 2012, David T. Shulick, a lawyer, owned the school system. He controlled it through Unique Educational Experiences Inc. and Shulick's law office was used as the headquarters of that company.

== History ==
The school was first established as a for-profit private school in 1969. The original campus was located on Bustleton Avenue in Northeast Philadelphia and was named the Student Education Center - Delaware Valley High School. It offered class credit to struggling students from area high schools, including Lincoln High School and George Washington High School.

Beginning around 2002, the School District of Philadelphia began contracting with DVHS. The district sent students at risk of dropping out and students with discipline problems to DVHS schools. In 2012 the district paid DVHS $4.1 million to operate two schools.

By 2012, the system had four alternative schools with 50 employees in the administrative and teaching sectors. That year, U.S. federal authorities began investigating payments from Delaware Valley High School to 259 Strategies L.L.C., a company owned by the son of Congressman Chaka Fattah. The school laid off all of its employees in July 2012.
