= Gating signal =

Conditions to be met in order to let a signal flow

Signal gating is a concept commonly used in the field of electronics and signal processing. It refers to the process of controlling the flow of signals based on certain conditions or criteria. The goal of signal gating is to selectively allow or block the transmission of signals through a circuit or system.

In signal gating, a gating signal is used to modulate the passage of the main signal. The gating signal acts as a control mechanism, determining when the main signal can pass through the gate and when it is blocked. The gating signal can be generated by various means, such as an external trigger, a specific voltage level, or a specific frequency range.

Signal gating is often employed in applications where precise control over the transmission of signals is required. Here are a few examples of how signal gating is used in different fields:

1. Telecommunications: In telecommunications systems, signal gating is used to regulate the flow of data packets. By opening and closing the gate based on specific criteria, such as error detection or network congestion, signal gating helps ensure that the data is transmitted efficiently and reliably.

2. Audio processing: In audio applications, signal gating is used to reduce background noise or eliminate unwanted sounds. For example, in live sound reinforcement, a noise gate is often employed to mute or attenuate the microphone signal when the sound level falls below a certain threshold. This helps minimize the pickup of ambient noise and unwanted signals.

3. Radar systems: Signal gating plays a crucial role in radar systems, particularly in pulse-Doppler radar. Gating is used to control the transmission and reception of radar pulses, allowing the system to focus on specific ranges or angles of interest while ignoring other signals. This helps improve target detection and reduces interference from unwanted reflections.

4. Medical imaging: Signal gating is utilized in medical imaging techniques like computed tomography (CT) and magnetic resonance imaging (MRI). Gating is used to synchronize the data acquisition process with the patient's respiratory or cardiac cycle. By acquiring data only during specific phases of the cycle, image artifacts caused by motion can be minimized, resulting in higher-quality images.

Signal gating can be implemented using various electronic components, such as transistors, operational amplifiers, digital logic circuits, or specialized integrated circuits designed for gating purposes. The specific method used depends on the application requirements and the characteristics of the signals being processed.

Overall, signal gating provides a means to control the flow of signals and is widely used in diverse fields to enhance the efficiency, accuracy, and quality of signal transmission and processing.
