= Radiation treatment planning =

In cancer or tumor treatments

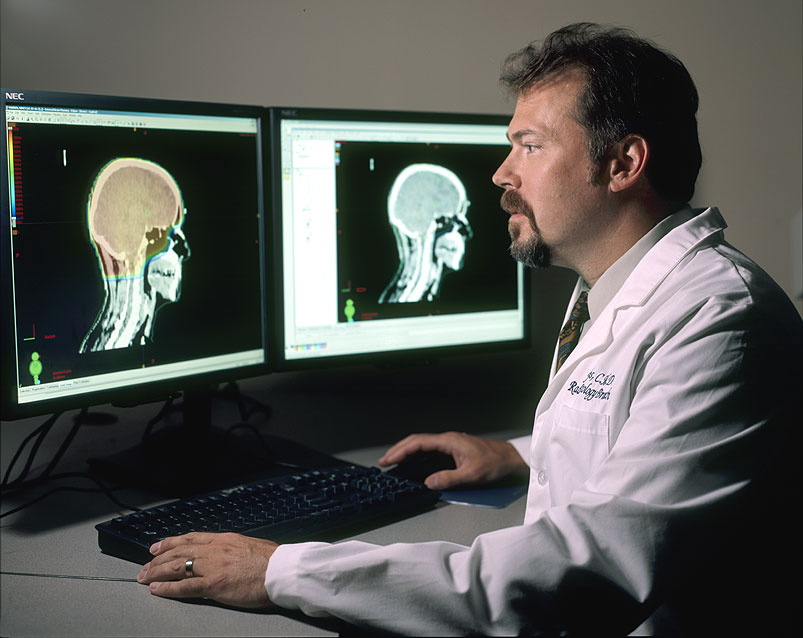
Doctor reviewing a radiation treatment plan

In radiotherapy, radiation treatment planning (RTP) is the process in which a team consisting of radiation oncologists, radiation therapist, medical physicists and medical dosimetrists plan the appropriate external beam radiotherapy or internal brachytherapy treatment technique for a patient with cancer.

== History ==
In the early days of radiotherapy planning was performed on 2D x-ray images, often by hand and with manual calculations. Computerised treatment planning systems began to be used in the 1970s to improve the accuracy and speed of dose calculations.

By the 1990s CT scans, more powerful computers, improved dose calculation algorithms and Multileaf collimators (MLCs) lead to 3D conformal planning (3DCRT), categorised as a Level 2 technique by the European Dynarad consortium. 3DCRT uses MLCs to shape the radiotherapy beam to closely match the shape of a target tumour, reducing the dose to healthy surrounding tissue.

Level 3 techniques such as IMRT and VMAT utilise inverse planning to provide further improved dose distributions (i.e. better coverage of target tumours and sparing of healthy tissue). These methods are growing in use, particularly for cancers in certain locations which have been shown to derive the greatest benefits.

== Image guided planning ==
Typically, medical imaging is used to form a virtual patient for a computer-aided design procedure. A CT scan is often the primary image set for treatment planning while magnetic resonance imaging provides excellent secondary image set for soft tissue contouring. Positron emission tomography is less commonly used and reserved for cases where specific uptake studies can enhance planning target volume delineation. Modern treatment planning systems provide tools for multimodality image matching, also known as image coregistration or fusion. Treatment simulations are used to plan the geometric, radiological, and dosimetric aspects of the therapy using radiation transport simulations and optimization. For intensity modulated radiation therapy (IMRT), this process involves selecting the appropriate beam type (which may include photons, electrons and protons), energy (e.g. 6, 18 megaelectronvolt (MeV) photons) and physical arrangements. In brachytherapy planning involves selecting the appropriate catheter positions and source dwell times (in HDR brachytherapy) or seed positions (in LDR brachytherapy).

The more formal optimization process is typically referred to as forward planning and inverse planning. Plans are often assessed with the aid of dose-volume histograms, allowing the clinician to evaluate the uniformity of the dose to the diseased tissue (tumor) and sparing of healthy structures.

=== Forward planning ===
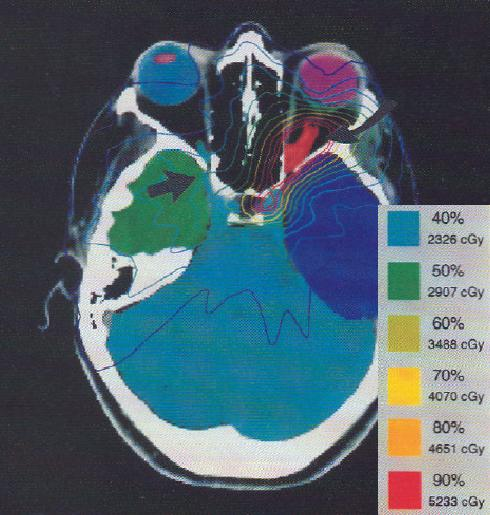
Treatment plan for an Optic nerve sheath meningioma

In forward planning, the planner places beams into a radiotherapy treatment planning system that can deliver sufficient radiation to a tumour while both sparing critical organs and minimising the dose to healthy tissue. The required decisions include how many radiation beams to use, which angles each will be delivered from, whether attenuating wedges be used, and which MLC configuration will be used to shape the radiation from each beam.

Once the treatment planner has made an initial plan, the treatment planning system calculates the required monitor units to deliver a prescribed dose to a specific area, and the distribution of dose in the body this will create. The dose distribution in the patient is dependent on the anatomy and beam modifiers such as wedges, specialized collimation, field sizes, tumor depth, etc. The information from a prior CT scan of the patient allows more accurate modelling of the behaviour of the radiation as it travels through the patient's tissues. Different dose calculation models are available, including pencil beam, convolution-superposition and monte carlo simulation, with precision versus computation time being the relevant trade-off.

This type of planning is only sufficiently adept to handle relatively simple cases in which the tumour has a simple shape and is not near any critical organs.

=== Inverse planning ===
In inverse planning a radiation oncologist defines a patient's critical organs and tumour, after which a planner gives target doses and importance factors for each. Then, an optimisation program is run to find the treatment plan which best matches all the input criteria.

In contrast to the manual trial-and-error process of forward planning, inverse planning uses the optimiser to solve the Inverse Problem as set up by the planner.

== See also ==
- Brachytherapy planning
- Image-guided radiation therapy
