= Radiosensitizer =

Cisplatin, a platinum-based chemotherapeutic and radio sensitizer

A radiosensitizer is an agent that makes tumor cells more sensitive to radiation therapy. It is sometimes also known as a radiation sensitizer or radio-enhancer.

== Mechanism of action ==
Conventional chemotherapeutics are currently being used in conjunction with radiation therapy to increase its effectiveness. Examples include the fluoropyrimidines, gemcitabine and platinum analogs; fluoropyrimidines increase sensitivity by dysregulating S-phase cell cycle checkpoints in tumor cells. Gemcitabine progresses through a similar mechanism, causing cells in the S-phase to disrepair DNA damage caused by the radiation. Platinum analogs such as cisplatin inhibit DNA repair by cross linking strands, and so aggravate the effects of DNA damage induced by radiation. Radiosensitizers enhance the effects of radiation therapy through various mechanisms, broadly classified as:

=== DNA Damage Enhancement ===
These agents increase DNA damage caused by radiation or inhibit its repair.

- Halogenated pyrimidines: Incorporate into DNA, making it more susceptible to radiation damage.
- Platinum analogs: Create DNA crosslinks, preventing repair.
- PARP inhibitors: Block DNA repair enzymes, increasing damage.

=== Cell Cycle Interference ===
These agents disrupt the cell cycle, increasing radiosensitivity at specific phases.

- Taxanes: Arrest cells in the radiosensitive G2/M phase.
- Antimetabolites: Interfere with DNA synthesis, leading to cell cycle arrest.

=== Hypoxia Modification ===
These agents address low oxygen levels (hypoxia) in tumors, which can hinder radiation effectiveness.

- Nitroimidazoles: Mimic oxygen, enhancing free radical formation in hypoxic cells.
- Oxygen delivery agents: Improve oxygen supply to tumors.

== Limitations ==
One of the major limitations of radiotherapy is that the cells of solid tumors become deficient in oxygen. Solid tumors can outgrow their blood supply, causing a low-oxygen state known as hypoxia. Oxygen is a potent radiosensitizer, increasing the effectiveness of a given dose of radiation by forming DNA-damaging free radicals. Tumor cells in a hypoxic environment may be as much as 2 to 3 times more resistant to radiation damage than those in a normal oxygen environment. Much research has been devoted to overcoming this problem including the use of high pressure oxygen tanks, blood substitutes that carry increased oxygen, hypoxic cell radiosensitizers such as misonidazole and metronidazole, and hypoxic cytotoxins, such as tirapazamine.

== Drug development ==
As of September 2016, there are a number of radiosensitizers in clinical trials.

Name	Sponsor	Description
NBTXR3	Nanobiotix	Also known as PEP503, NBTXR3 is injected via syringe directly into tumors by a surgeon. The drug then creates free radicals when exposed to x-rays. It is composed of hafnium oxide nanoparticles. The company is running four trials on the drug simultaneously. The four trials are a Phase II/III in soft tissue sarcoma of the extremity and trunk wall, a Phase I/II for hepatocellular carcinoma, a Phase I/II for prostate cancer, and a Phase I for squamous cell carcinoma of the oral cavity.
Nimoral	Azanta	This compound increases the yield of DNA damage from irradiation under hypoxic conditions. Nimoral is in Phase III in Europe as a first-line therapy for squamous cell carcinoma of the head and neck.
Trans Sodium Crocetinate (TSC)	Diffusion Pharmaceuticals	TSC is meant to increase the diffusion of oxygen through tissue. It was tested in a Phase II clinical trial in glioblastoma (GBM) patients. The results of the Phase II showed that 36% of the full-dose TSC patients were alive at 2 years, compared with historical survival values ranging from 27% to 30% for the standard of care.
NVX-108	NuvOx Pharma	NVX-108 is an oxygen therapeutic that is injected intravenously, picks up oxygen in the lungs, and delivers oxygen to hypoxic tissue. It is a Phase Ib/II clinical trial where it raises tumor oxygen levels prior to radiation therapy in order to radiosensitize them.
