= 18F-EF5 =

Names
- Preferred IUPAC name 2-(2-Nitro-1H-imidazol-1-yl)-N-(2,2,3,3,3-pentafluoropropyl)acetamide
- Other names NSC-684681; EF-5

Identifiers
CAS Number	152721-37-4
3D model (JSmol)	Interactive image
ChemSpider	344807
PubChem CID	389053
UNII	383HJ2T87O
CompTox Dashboard (EPA)	DTXSID10165114
- InChI: InChI=1S/C8H7F5N4O3/c9-7(10,8(11,12)13)4-15-5(18)3-16-2-1-14-6(16)17(19)20/h1-2H,3-4H2,(H,15,18) Key: JGGDSDPOPRWSCX-UHFFFAOYSA-N
- SMILES: O=[N+]([O-])c1nccn1CC(=O)NCC(F)(F)C(F)(F)F

Properties
Chemical formula	C_{8}H_{7}F_{5}N_{4}O_{3}
Molar mass	302.161 g·mol^{−1}
- Except where otherwise noted, data are given for materials in their standard state (at 25 °C [77 °F], 100 kPa). verify (what is ?) Infobox references

EF5 is a nitroimidazole derivative used in oncology research. Due to its similarity in chemical structure to etanidazole, EF5 binds in cells displaying hypoxia.

Non-labeled EF5 has been extensively used in immunohistochemical studies for several years and its hypoxia specificity has been comprehensively evaluated The ^{18}F-radiolabeled derivative of EF5 is being studied for its possibility to be used in positron emission tomography (PET) to detect low levels of oxygen in brain tumors and several other malignant tumors. This can help show how a tumor will respond to treatment.

Targeting tumor hypoxia in cancer treatment aims to overcome radiotherapy resistance of hypoxic tumors. Thus, a major clinical implication for ^{18}F-EF5-PET imaging is expected to be guiding of radiotherapy dose modulation. Clinical studies on ^{18}F-EF5-PET/CT imaging have indicated clinically acceptable biodistribution and dosimetric profile, and in head and neck cancer also favorable imaging characteristics, prognostic value and repeatability. A recent 18F-EF5-PET/MR study showed promising potential in detecting tumor hypoxia in cervical cancer. However, ^{18}F-EF5-PET/CT is not feasible in imaging of ovarian cancer due to physiological intra-abdominal ^{18}F-EF5-accumulation. Further studies evaluating the clinical use of ^{18}F-EF5 PET imaging in head and neck cancer are ongoing.
