= Moist desquamation =

Moist shedding of the skin following radiation exposure

Moist desquamation is a description of the clinical pattern seen as a consequence of radiation exposure where the skin thins and then begins to weep because of loss of integrity of the epithelial barrier and decreased oncotic pressure. Moist desquamation is a rare complication for most forms of radiology; however, it is far more common in fluoroscopy where threshold doses lie between 10 and 15 Gy and increasingly common above 15 Gy. It has been noted that fractionation of fluoroscopic procedures significantly reduces the likelihood of moist desquamation occurring. In animal studies done on pig skin, moist desquamation was found to occur with a 50% of the time after a single dose of 28 Gy; however, a 2×18 Gy fractionation scheme (36 Gy total dose) was needed to produce the same 50% occurrence.

Moist desquamation is a common side effect of radiotherapy treatment, where approximately 36% of radiotherapy patients will present with symptoms of moist desquamation. While modern megavoltage external beam radiotherapy have peak radiation doses below the skin, older orthvoltage systems have peak radiation doses at the skin of a patient. As such, moist desquamtation and other skin related radiotherapy complications were significantly more commonplace before the introduction of higher energy cobalt therapy and linear accelerator systems between the 1950s to 1970s.

Historically, this was a common phenomenon in Hiroshima and Nagasaki during World War II with the atomic bomb attacks from the United States. The phenomenon was described by John Hersey in his 1946 article, and later book, Hiroshima.

== Clinical characteristics ==
Sloughing of the epidermis and exposure of the dermal layer clinically characterize moist desquamation. Moist desquamation presents as tender, red skin associated with serous exudate, hemorrhagic crusting, and has the potential for development of bullae.

== Treatment ==
Due to the deterministic nature of moist desquamation, once symptoms occur the condition itself can not be reversed and a patient must wait for the condition to subside. Management of these partial-thickness wounds has been influenced by the Winter principle of moist wound healing, which suggests that wounds heal more rapidly in a moist environment. Hydrocolloid dressings applied directly to these wounds prevent the evaporation of moisture from the exposed dermis and create a moist environment at the wound site that promotes cell migration. As additional radiation exposure may either exacerbate or cause the re-occurrence of moist dequamation, patients are advised to use sunscreen over the irradiated area after completion of treatment.
