= External beam radiotherapy =

Treatment of cancer with ionized radiation

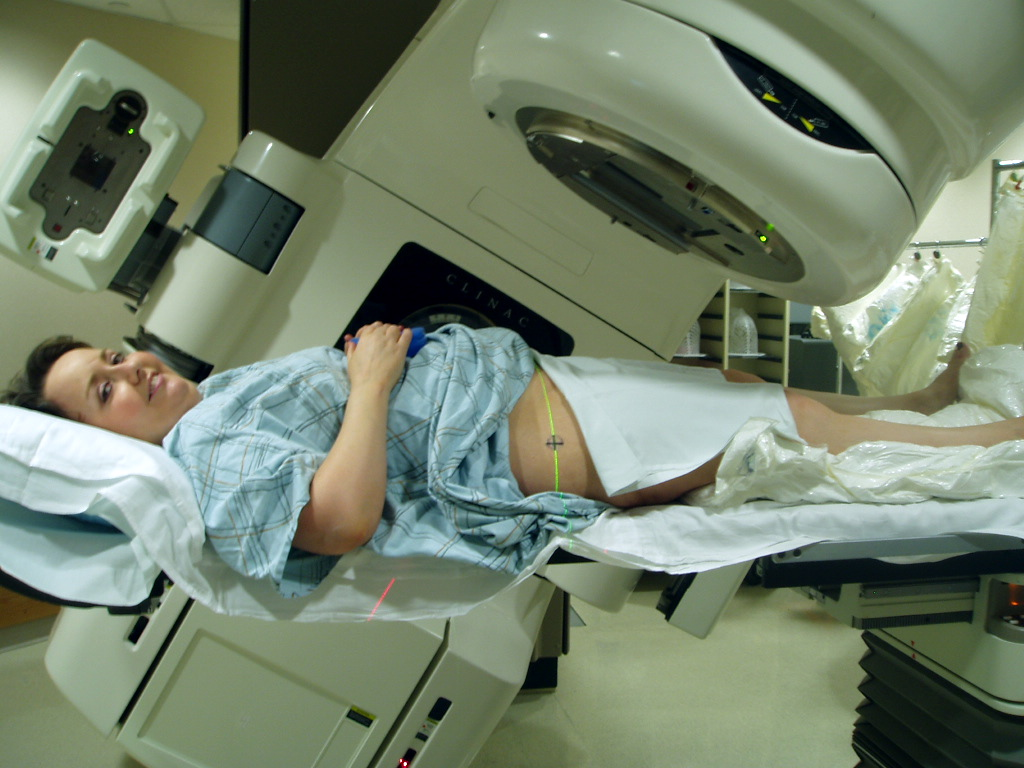
- Radiation therapy of the pelvis. Lasers and a mold under the legs are used to determine exact position.
- Other names: Teletherapy
- ICD-10-PCS: D?0
- ICD-9-CM: 92.21-92.26

External beam radiation therapy (EBRT) is a form of radiotherapy that utilizes a high-energy collimated beam of ionizing radiation, from a source outside the body, to target and kill cancer cells. The radiotherapy beam is composed of particles, which are focussed in a particular direction of travel using collimators. Each radiotherapy beam consists of one type of particle intended for use in treatment, though most beams contain some contamination by other particle types.

Radiotherapy beams are classified by the particle they are intended to deliver, such as photons (as x-rays or gamma rays), electrons, and heavy ions; x-rays and electron beams are by far the most widely used sources for external beam radiotherapy. Orthovoltage ("superficial") X-rays are used for treating skin cancer and superficial structures. Megavoltage X-rays are used to treat deep-seated tumors (e.g. bladder, bowel, prostate, lung, or brain), whereas megavoltage electron beams are typically used to treat superficial lesions extending to a depth of approximately 5 cm. A small number of centers operate experimental and pilot programs employing beams of heavier particles, particularly protons, owing to the rapid decrease in absorbed dose beneath the depth of the target.

Teletherapy is the most common form of radiotherapy (radiation therapy). The patient sits or lies on a couch and an external source of ionizing radiation is pointed at a particular part of the body. In contrast to brachytherapy (sealed source radiotherapy) and unsealed source radiotherapy, in which the radiation source is inside the body, external beam radiotherapy directs the radiation at the tumor from outside the body.

== X-rays and gamma rays ==
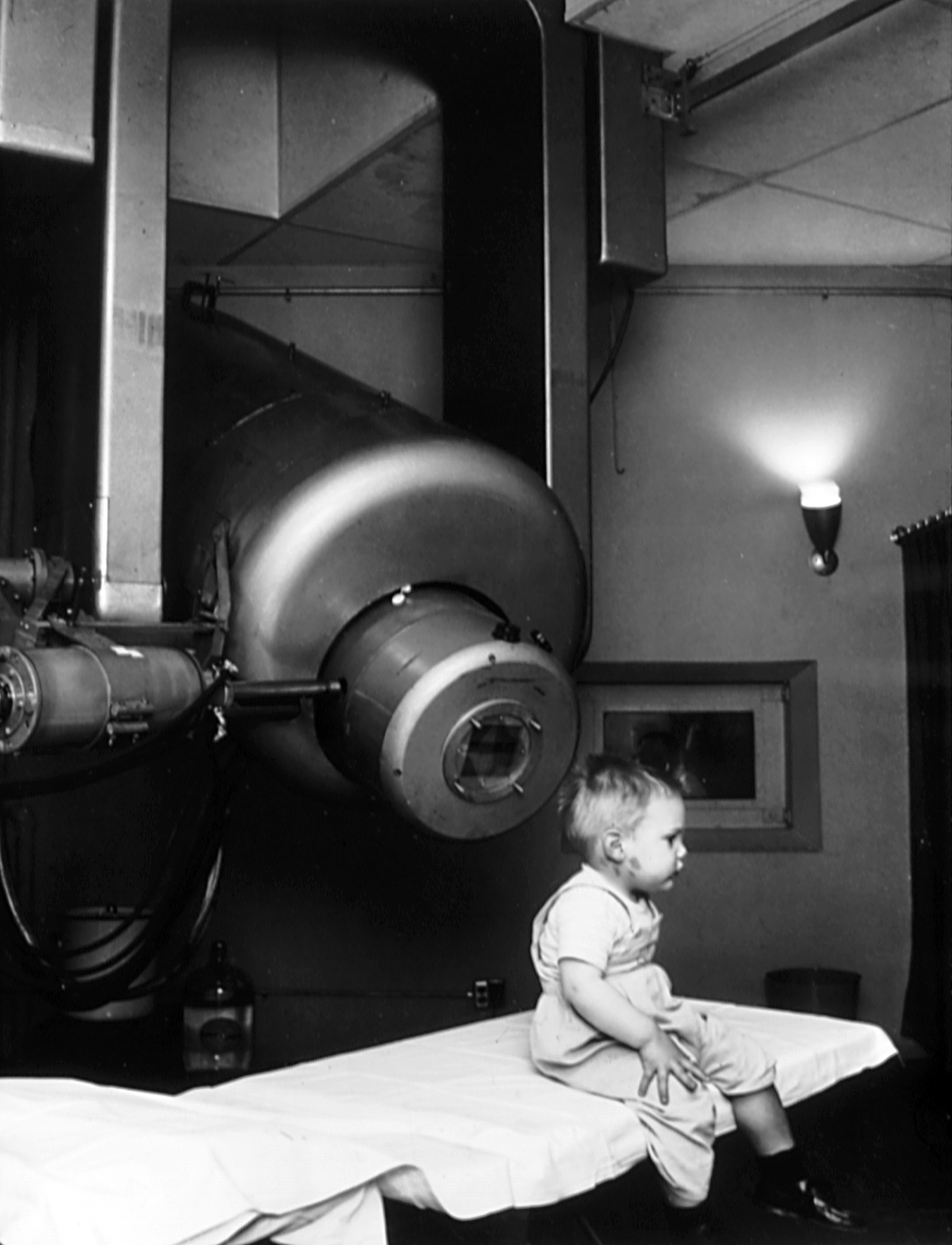
Historical image showing Gordon Isaacs, the first patient treated with linear accelerator radiation therapy (in this case an electron beam) for retinoblastoma in 1957. Gordon's right eye was removed January 11, 1957, because his cancer had spread. His left eye, however, had only a localized tumor that prompted Henry Kaplan to try to treat it with the electron beam.

Conventionally, the energy of diagnostic and therapeutic gamma- and X-rays is on the order of kiloelectronvolts (keV) or megaelectronvolts (MeV), and the energy of therapeutic electrons is on the order of megaelectronvolts. The beam is made up of a spectrum of energies: the maximum energy is approximately equal to the beam's maximum electric potential within a linear accelerator multiplied by the electron charge. For instance, a 1 megavolt beam will produce photons with a maximum energy around 1 MeV. In practice, the mean X-ray energy is about one-third of the maximum energy. Beam quality and hardness may be improved by X-ray filters, which improves the homogeneity of the X-ray spectrum.

Medically useful X-rays are produced when electrons are accelerated to energies at which either the photoelectric effect predominates (for diagnostic use, since the photoelectric effect offers comparatively excellent contrast with effective atomic number Z) or Compton scattering and pair production predominate (at energies above approximately 200 keV for the former and 1 MeV for the latter), for therapeutic X-ray beams. Some examples of X-ray energies used in medicine are:

- Very low-energy superficial X-rays – 35 to 60 keV (mammography, which prioritizes soft-tissue contrast, uses very low-energy kV X-rays)
- Superficial radiotherapy X-rays – 60 to 150 keV
- Diagnostic X-rays – 20 to 150 keV (mammography to CT); this is the range of photon energies at which the photoelectric effect, which gives maximal soft-tissue contrast, predominates.
- Orthovoltage X-rays – 200 to 500 keV
- Supervoltage X-rays – 500 to 1000 keV
- Megavoltage X-rays – 1 to 25 MeV (in practice, nominal energies above 15 MeV are unusual in clinical practice).

Megavoltage X-rays are by far most common in radiotherapy for the treatment of a wide range of cancers. Superficial and orthovoltage X-rays have application for the treatment of cancers at or close to the skin surface. Typically, higher-energy megavoltage X-rays are chosen when it is desirable to maximize "skin-sparing" (since the relative dose to the skin is lower for such high-energy beams).

Medically useful photon beams can also be derived from a radioactive source such as iridium-192, caesium-137, or cobalt-60. (Radium-226 has also been used as such a source in the past, though has been replaced in this capacity by less harmful radioisotopes.) Such photon beams, derived from radioactive decay, are approximately monochromatic, in contrast to the continuous bremsstrahlung spectrum from a linac. These decays include the emission of gamma rays, whose energy is isotope-specific and ranges between 300 keV and 1.5 MeV.

Superficial radiation therapy machines produce low energy x-rays in the same energy range as diagnostic x-ray machines, 20–150 keV, to treat skin conditions. Orthovoltage X-ray machines produce higher energy x-rays in the range 200–500 keV. Radiation from orthovoltage x-ray machines has been called "deep" due to its greater penetrating ability, allowing it to treat tumors at depths unreachable by lower-energy "superficial" radiation. Orthovoltage units have essentially the same design as diagnostic X-ray machines and are generally limited to photon energies less than 600 keV. X-rays with energies on the order of 1 MeV are generated in Linear accelerators ("linacs"). The first use of a linac for medical radiotherapy was in 1953. Commercially available medical linacs produce X-rays and electrons with an energy range from 4 MeV up to around 25 MeV. The X-rays themselves are produced by the rapid deceleration of electrons in a target material, typically a tungsten alloy, which produces an X-ray spectrum via bremsstrahlung radiation. The shape and intensity of the beam produced by a linac may be modified or collimated by a variety of means. Thus, conventional, conformal, intensity-modulated, tomographic, and stereotactic radiotherapy are all provided using specially modified linear accelerators.

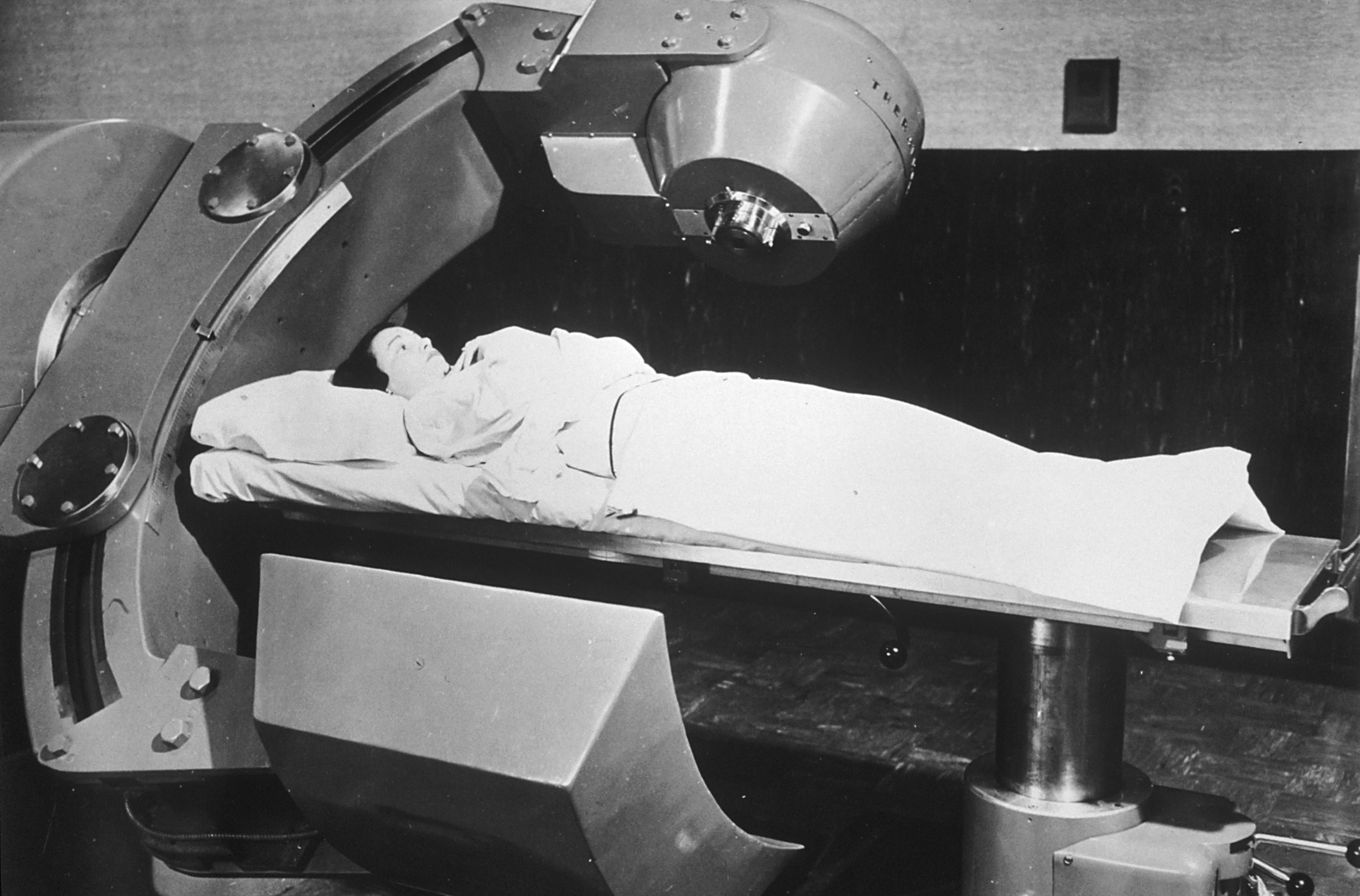
Cobalt-60 beam machine from 1951

Cobalt units use radiation from cobalt-60, which emits two gamma rays at energies of 1.17 and 1.33 MeV, a dichromatic beam with an average energy of 1.25 MeV. The role of the cobalt unit has largely been replaced by the linear accelerator, which can generate higher energy radiation. Nonetheless, cobalt treatment still retains some applications, such as the Gamma Knife, since the machinery is relatively reliable and simple to maintain compared to the modern linear accelerator.

=== Sources and properties of X-rays ===
Bremsstrahlung X-rays are produced by bombarding energetic cathode rays (electrons) onto a target made of a material with high atomic number, such as tungsten. The target acts as a sort of transducer, converting part of the electrons' kinetic energy into energetic photons. Kilovoltage X-rays are typically produced using an X-ray tube, in which electrons travel through a vacuum from a hot cathode to a cold anode, which also acts as the target. However, it is impractical to produce megavoltage X-rays using this method; instead, a linear accelerator is most commonly used to produce X-rays of such energy. X-ray emission is more forward-directed at megavoltage energies and more laterally directed at kilovoltage energies. Consequently, kilovoltage X-rays tend to be produced using a reflection-type target, in which the radiation is emitted back from the target's surface, while megavoltage X-rays tend to be produced with a transmission target in which the X-rays are emitted on the side opposite that of electron incidence. Reflection type targets exhibit the heel effect and can use a rotating anode to aid in heat dissipation.

Compton scattering is the dominant interaction between a megavoltage beam and the patient, while the photoelectric effect dominates at keV energies. Additionally, Compton scattering is much less dependent on atomic number than the photoelectric effect; while kilovoltage beams enhance the distinction between muscle and bone in medical imaging, megavoltage beams suppress that distinction to the advantage of teletherapy. Pair production and photoneutron production increase at higher energies, only becoming significant at energies on the order of 1 MeV.

X-ray energy in the keV range is described by the electrical voltage used to produce it. For instance, a 100 kVp beam is produced by a 100 kV voltage applied to an X-ray tube and will have a maximum photon energy of 100 keV. However, the beam's spectrum can be affected by other factors as well, such as the voltage waveform and external X-ray filtration. These factors are reflected in the beam's half-value layer (HVL), measured in-air under conditions of "good geometry". A typical superficial X-ray energy might be 100 kVp per 3 mmAl – "100 kilovolts applied to the X-ray tube with a measured half-value layer of 3 millimeters of aluminum". The half-value layer for orthovoltage beams is more typically measured using copper; a typical orthovoltage energy is 250 kVp per 2 mmCu. For X-rays in the MeV range, an actual voltage of the same magnitude is not used in production of the beam. A 6 MV beam contains photons of no more than 1 MeV, rather than 6 MeV; the energy of such a beam is instead generally characterized by measuring the ratio of the beam's intensity at varying depths in a medium.

Kilovoltage beams do not exhibit a build-up effect and thus deposit their maximum dose at the surface, i.e. d_{max} = 0 or D_{0} = 100%. Conversely, megavoltage beams do exhibit the buildup effect deposit; they deposit their maximum dose at some depth below the surface, i.e. d_{max} > 0. The depth of dose maximum is governed by the range of the electrons liberated upstream during Compton scattering. At depths beyond d_{max}, the dose profile of all X-ray beams decreases roughly exponentially with depth. Though actual values of d_{max} are influenced by various factors, the following are representative benchmark values.

Representative d_{max}
Voltage (MV)	< 1	4	6	9	10	14	20	24	25	34
d_{max} (cm)	0	1	1.5	1.9	2.3	2.7	3.5	3.9	3.8	4.7

== Electrons ==
X-rays are generated by bombarding a high atomic number material with electrons. If the target is removed (and the beam current decreased), a high energy electron beam is obtained. Electron beams are useful for treating superficial lesions, because the maximum dose deposition occurs near the surface and thereafter decreases rapidly with depth, sparing underlying tissue. Electron beams usually have nominal energies in the range of 4–20 MeV, corresponding to a treatment range of approximately 1–5 cm (in water-equivalent tissue). Energies above 18 MeV are rarely used. Although the X-ray target is removed in electron mode, the beam must be fanned out by sets of thin scattering foils in order to achieve flat and symmetric dose profiles in the treated tissue.

Many linear accelerators can produce both electrons and x-rays.

== Hadron therapy ==
Hadron therapy involves the therapeutic use of protons, neutrons, and heavier ions (fully ionized atomic nuclei). Of these, proton therapy is by far the most common, though still rare compared to other forms of external beam radiotherapy, since it requires large and expensive equipment. The gantry (the part that rotates around the patient) is a multi-story structure, and a proton therapy system can cost (as of 2009) up to US$150 million.

== Multi-leaf collimator ==
Modern linear accelerators are equipped with multileaf collimators (MLCs), which can move within the radiation field as the linac gantry rotates, and block the field as necessary according to the gantry position. This technology allows radiotherapy treatment planners great flexibility in shielding organs-at-risk (OARs), while ensuring that the prescribed dose is delivered to the target organs. A typical multi-leaf collimator consists of two sets of 40 to 160 leaves, each around 5–10 mm thick and several centimetres long in the other two dimensions. Each leaf in the MLC is aligned parallel to the radiation field and can be moved independently to block part of the field, adapting it to the shape of the tumor (by adjusting the position of the leaves), thus minimizing the amount of healthy tissue subject to radiation exposure. On older linacs without MLCs, this must be accomplished manually using several hand-crafted blocks.

== Intensity modulated radiation therapy ==
A teletherapy radiation capsule composed of the following: A.) an international standard source holder (usually lead), B.) a retaining ring, and C.) a teletherapy "source" composed of D.) two nested stainless steel canisters welded to E.) two stainless steel lids surrounding F.) a protective internal shield (usually uranium metal or a tungsten alloy) and G.) a cylinder of radioactive source material, often but not always cobalt-60. The diameter of the "source" is 30 mm.

Intensity modulated radiation therapy (IMRT) is an advanced radiotherapy technique used to minimize the amount of normal tissue being irradiated in the treatment field. In some systems, this intensity modulation is achieved by moving the leaves in the MLC during the course of treatment, thereby delivering a radiation field with a non-uniform (i.e., modulated) intensity. Using IMRT, radiation oncologists are able to split the radiation beam into many beamlets and vary the intensity of each beamlet, and doctors are often able to further limit the amount of radiation received by healthy tissue near the tumor. Doctors have found that this sometimes allows them to safely give a higher dose of radiation to the tumor, potentially increasing the chance of successful treatment.

=== Volumetric modulated arc therapy ===
Volumetric modulated arc therapy (VMAT) is an extension of IMRT characterized by a linear accelerator rotating around the patient. This means that rather than radiation entering the patient at only a small number of fixed angles, it can enter at many angles. This can be beneficial for some treatment sites in which the target volume is surrounded by a number, allowing directed treatment without exposing nearby organs to heightened radiation levels.

=== Flattening filter free ===
The intensity of the X-rays produced in a megavoltage linac is much higher in the centre of the beam compared to the edges. To offset this central peak, a flattening filter is used. A flattening filter is cone-shaped so as to compensate for the forward bias in the momentum of incident electrons (and is typically made from a metal such as tungsten); after an X-ray beam passes through the flattening filter, it has a more uniform profile. This simplifies treatment planning, though significantly reduces the intensity of the beam. With greater computing power and more efficient treatment planning algorithms, the need for simpler treatment planning techniques – such as "forward planning", in which the planner directly instructs the linac on how to deliver the prescribed treatment – is reduced. This has led to increased interest in flattening filter free (FFF) treatments.

FFF treatments have been found to have an increased maximum dose rate, allowing reduced treatment times and a reduction in the effect of patient motion on the delivery of the treatment. This makes FFF an area of particular interest in stereotactic treatments. For instance, in treatment of breast cancer, the reduced treatment time may reduce patient movement and breast treatments where there is the potential to reduce breathing motion.

== Image-guided radiation therapy ==
Image-guided radiation therapy (IGRT) augments radiotherapy with imaging to increase the accuracy and precision of target localization, thereby reducing the amount of healthy tissue in the treatment field. To allow patients to benefit from sophisticated treatment techniques as IMRT or hadron therapy, patient alignment accuracies with an error margin of at most 0.5 mm are desirable. Therefore, methods such as stereoscopic digital kilovoltage imaging-based patient position verification (PPVS), and alignment estimation based on in-situ cone-beam computed tomography (CT), enrich the range of modern IGRT approaches.

== See also ==
- Brachytherapy
- Cyberknife
- Gamma Knife, a type of radiosurgery
- Intraoperative electron radiation therapy
- Intraoperative radiation therapy
- Neutron capture therapy of cancer
- Radiation therapy
- Tomotherapy

== General references ==
- Radiotherapy physics in practice, edited by JR Williams and DI Thwaites, Oxford University Press UK (2nd edition 2000), ISBN 0-19-262878-X
- Linear Particle Accelerator (Linac) Animation by Ionactive
  - http://www.myradiotherapy.com
- Superficial radiation therapy
- National Institute of Radiological Science (Japan)
