= Superficial X-rays =

- ICD-9: 92.21

Superficial X-rays are low-energy X-rays that do not penetrate very far before they are absorbed. They are produced by X-ray tubes operating at voltages in the 10–100 kV range, and therefore have peak energies in the 10–100 keV range. The Maximar-100 was a widely-adopted superficial radiation therapy unit.

Precise naming and definitions of energy ranges may vary, and X-rays at the lower end of this range may also be known as Grenz rays. They are useful in radiation therapy for the treatment of various benign or malignant skin problems, including skin cancer and severe eczema. They have a useful depth of up to 5 mm. In some locations, orthovoltage treatment is being replaced by electron therapy or brachytherapy.

As well as teletherapy, X-rays in this energy range (and the low orthovoltage range) are used for imaging patients, to analyse materials and objects in industrial radiography and for crystallography.
