= Cobalt-60 =

Radioactive isotope of cobalt

General
- Symbol: ^{60}Co
- Names: cobalt-60
- Protons (Z): 27
- Neutrons (N): 33

Nuclide data
- Natural abundance: trace
- Half-life (t_{1/2}): 5.2714 years
- Isotope mass: 59.9338222 Da
- Spin: 5+

Decay modes
- Decay mode: Decay energy (MeV)
- β^{-} (beta decay): 2.823

γ-ray spectrum of cobalt-60

Cobalt-60 (^{60}Co) is a synthetic radioactive isotope of cobalt with a half-life of 5.2714 years. It is produced artificially in nuclear reactors through neutron activation of ^{59}Co (of which natural cobalt consists entirely). Measurable quantities are also produced as a by-product of typical nuclear power plant operation and may be detected externally when leaks occur. In the latter case, the incidentally produced ^{60}Co is largely the result of multiple stages of neutron activation of iron isotopes in the reactor's steel structures via the creation of its ^{59}Co precursor. The simplest case of the latter would result from the activation of ^{58}Fe. ^{60}Co undergoes beta decay to an excited state of the stable isotope nickel-60 (^{60}Ni), which then emits two gamma rays with energies of 1.17 MeV and 1.33 MeV. The overall equation of the nuclear reaction (activation and decay) is: ^{59}_{27}Co + n → ^{60}_{27}Co → ^{60}_{28}Ni + e^{−} + ν̅_{e} + 2γ

== Activity ==
Given its half-life, the radioactive activity of a gram of ^{60}Co is close to 42 TBq (1,100 Ci). The absorbed dose constant, used in calculations of gamma-ray exposure, is related to the decay energy and time. For ^{60}Co it is equal to 0.35 mSv/(GBq h) at one meter from the source. This allows calculation of the equivalent dose, which depends on distance and activity - for example, 2.8 GBq or 60 μg of ^{60}Co, generates a dose of 1 mSv at 1 meter away, within an hour.

Test sources, such as those used for school experiments, have an activity of <100 kBq. Devices for nondestructive material testing use sources with activities of 1 TBq and more.

The decay energy of cobalt-60 amounts to about 26 watts per gram, about 40 times larger (by mass) than that of e.g. ^{238}Pu but still not very significant for practical sources.

== Decay ==
The decay scheme of ^{60}Co and ^{60m}Co.

The diagram shows a simplified decay scheme of ^{60}Co and ^{60m}Co. The main β-decay transitions are shown. The probability for population of the middle energy level of 2.1 MeV by β-decay is only 0.0022%, with a β-energy of 0.67 MeV. Transitions between the three levels generate six different gamma-ray frequencies. In the diagram the two important ones are marked. Internal conversion is not significant.

The half-value and 1/10th value layer thickness for shielding against this isotope's radiations has been determined for different materials:

Shielding thicknesses for cobalt-60
Absorber Material	Co-60 HVL (cm)	Co-60 1/10 VL (cm)
water (soft tissue)	13	—
plastic (acrylic)	11	—
steel	2.1	6.9
lead	1.0	4.0

== Applications ==
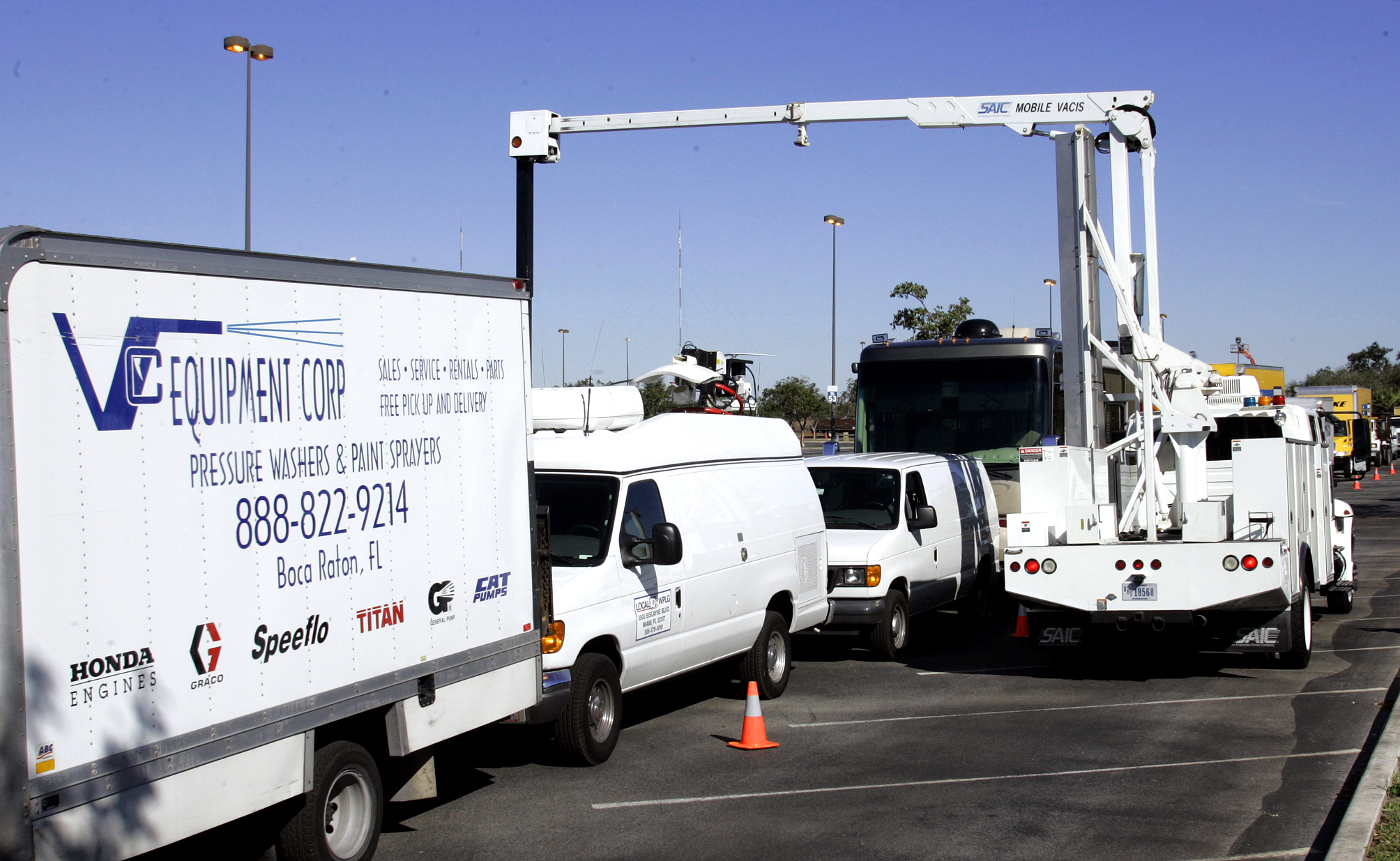
Security screening of cars at Super Bowl XLI using ^{60}Co gamma-ray scanner (2007)

The main advantage of ^{60}Co is that it is a high-intensity gamma-ray emitter with a relatively long half-life (over 5 years) compared to similar gamma-ray sources. The β-radiation is low-energy and easily shielded; however, the gamma rays are highly penetrating. The physical properties of cobalt such as resistance to bulk oxidation and low solubility in water give some advantages in safety in the case of a containment breach over some other gamma sources such as caesium-137. The main uses for ^{60}Co are:

- As a tracer for cobalt in chemical reactions
- Sterilization of medical equipment.
- Radiation source for medical radiotherapy; specifically cobalt therapy, which uses beams of gamma rays from ^{60}Co teletherapy machines.
- Radiation source for industrial radiography.
- Radiation source for leveling devices and thickness gauges.
- Radiation source for pest insect sterilization.
- As a radiation source for food irradiation and blood irradiation.
- As a primary standard for radiation dosimetry calibration.

Cobalt has been discussed as a "salting" element to add to nuclear weapons, to produce a cobalt bomb, an extremely "dirty" weapon which would contaminate large areas with ^{60}Co nuclear fallout, rendering them uninhabitable for a decade or more (multiple half-lives of cobalt-60) due to the gamma radiation field. In one design, the tamper of the weapon would be made of ^{59}Co (natural cobalt). When the bomb explodes, neutrons from the nuclear fission would irradiate the cobalt and transmute it to ^{60}Co. No country is known to have done any serious development of this type of weapon.

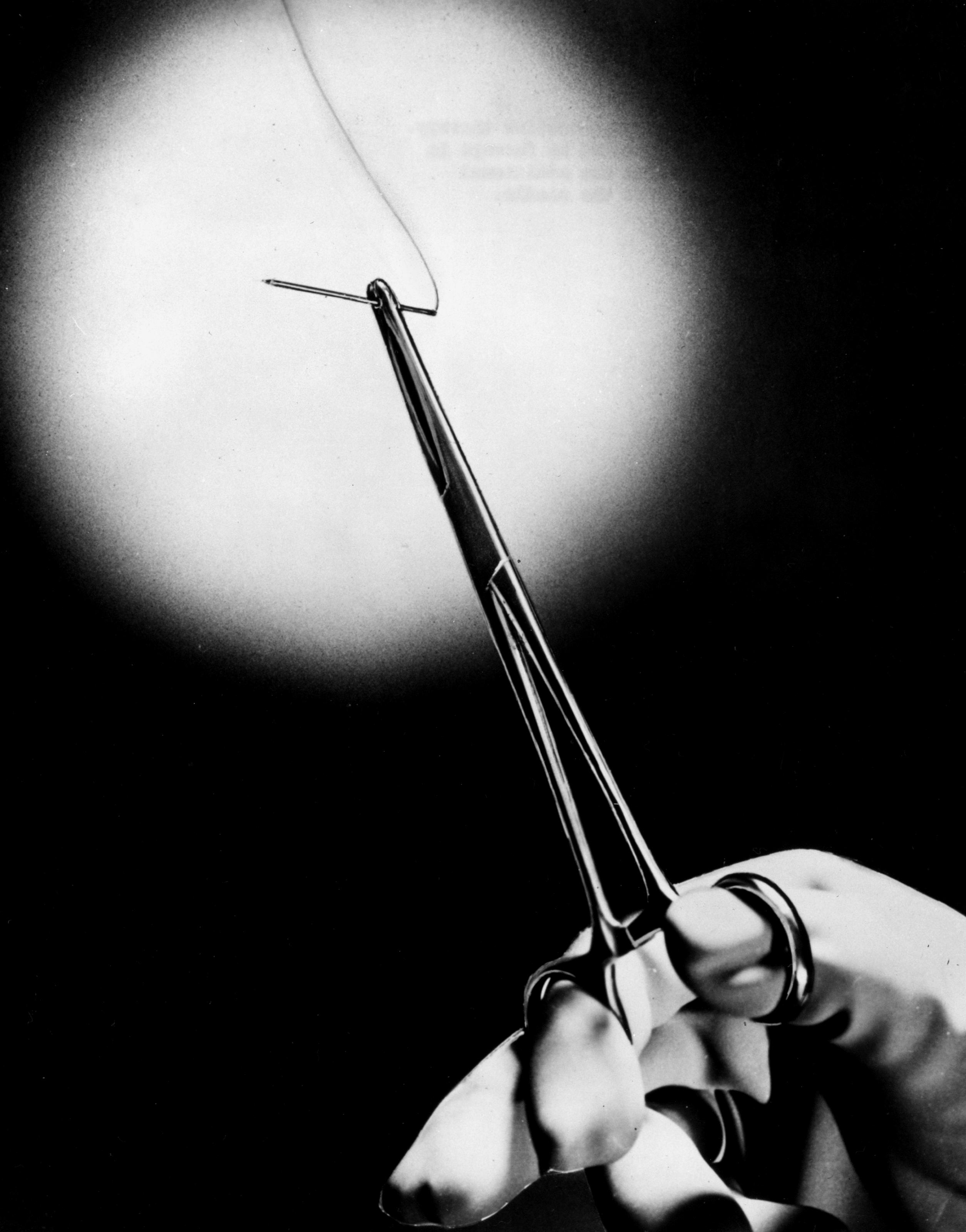
^{60}Co needle implanted in tumors for radiotherapy, around 1955.

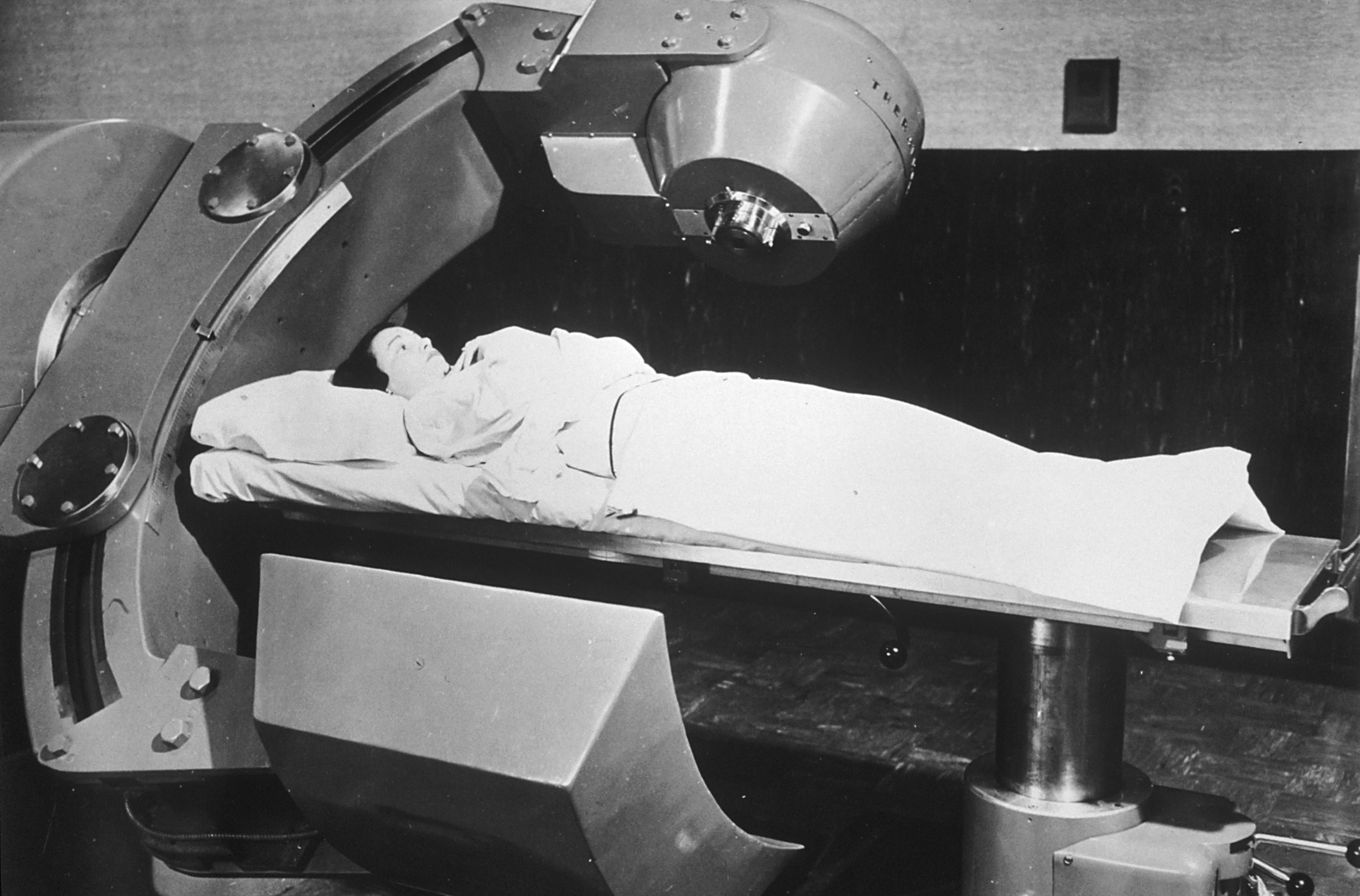
^{60}Co teletherapy machine for cancer radiotherapy, early 1950s.

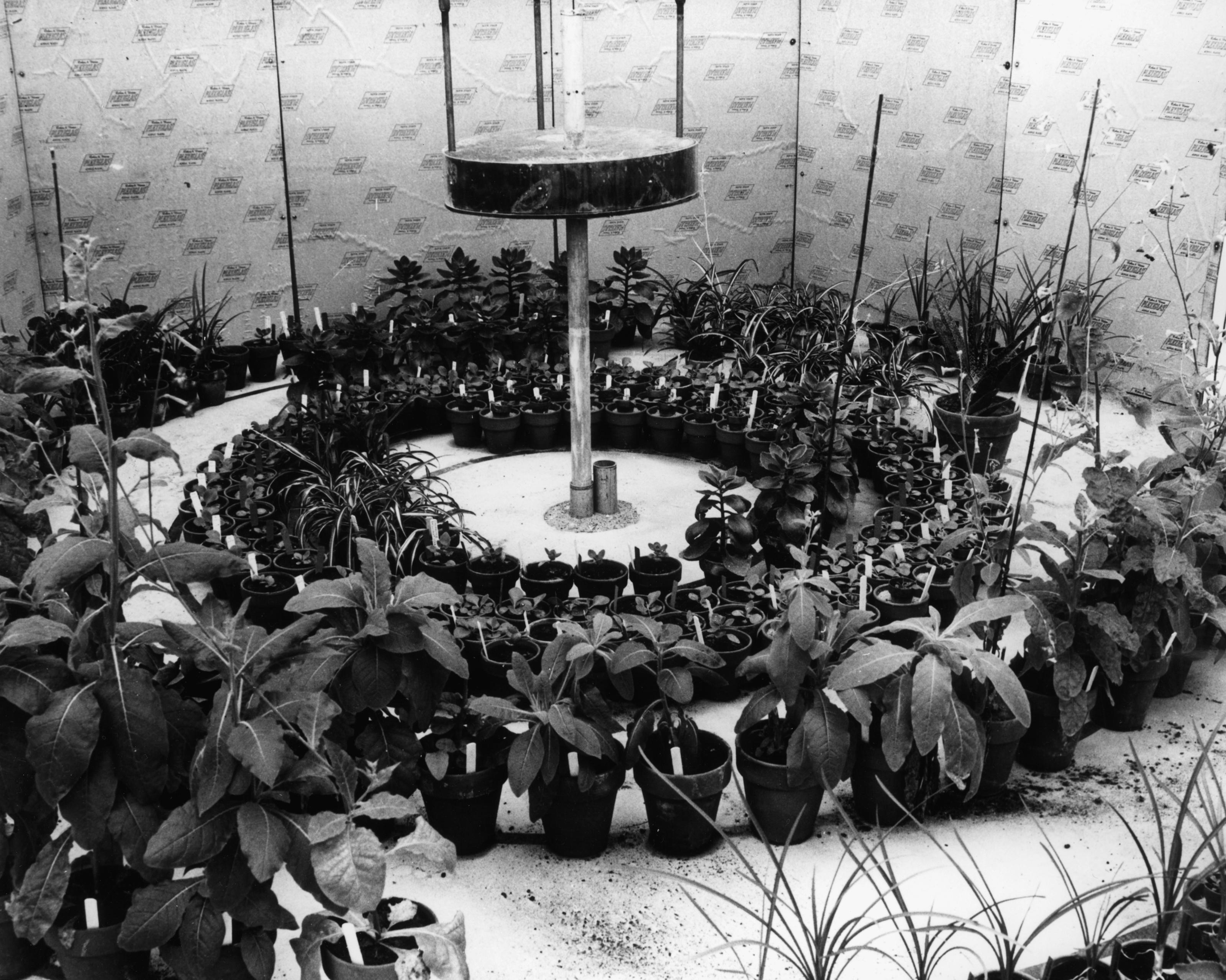
Brookhaven plant mutation experiment using ^{60}Co source in the pipe, center.

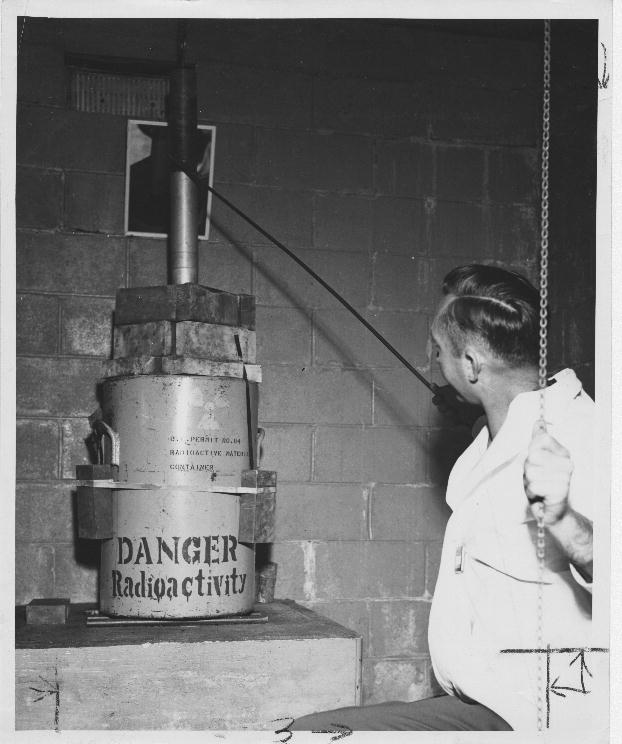
^{60}Co source for sterilizing screwflies in the 1959 Screwworm Eradication Program.

== Production ==
^{60}Co does not occur naturally on Earth in significant amounts, so ^{60}Co is synthesized by bombarding a ^{59}Co target with a thermal neutron source - in a commercial or industrial context, that means a nuclear reactor. The CANDU reactors can be used to activate ^{59}Co, by substituting the control rods with cobalt rods. In the United States, as of 2010, it is being produced in a boiling water reactor at Hope Creek Nuclear Generating Station. The cobalt targets are substituted here for a small number of fuel assemblies. Still, over 40% of all single-use medical devices are sterilized using ^{60}Co from Bruce nuclear generating station. The reaction in all cases is

^{59}Co + n → ^{60}Co + γ

(neutron capture).

== Safety ==
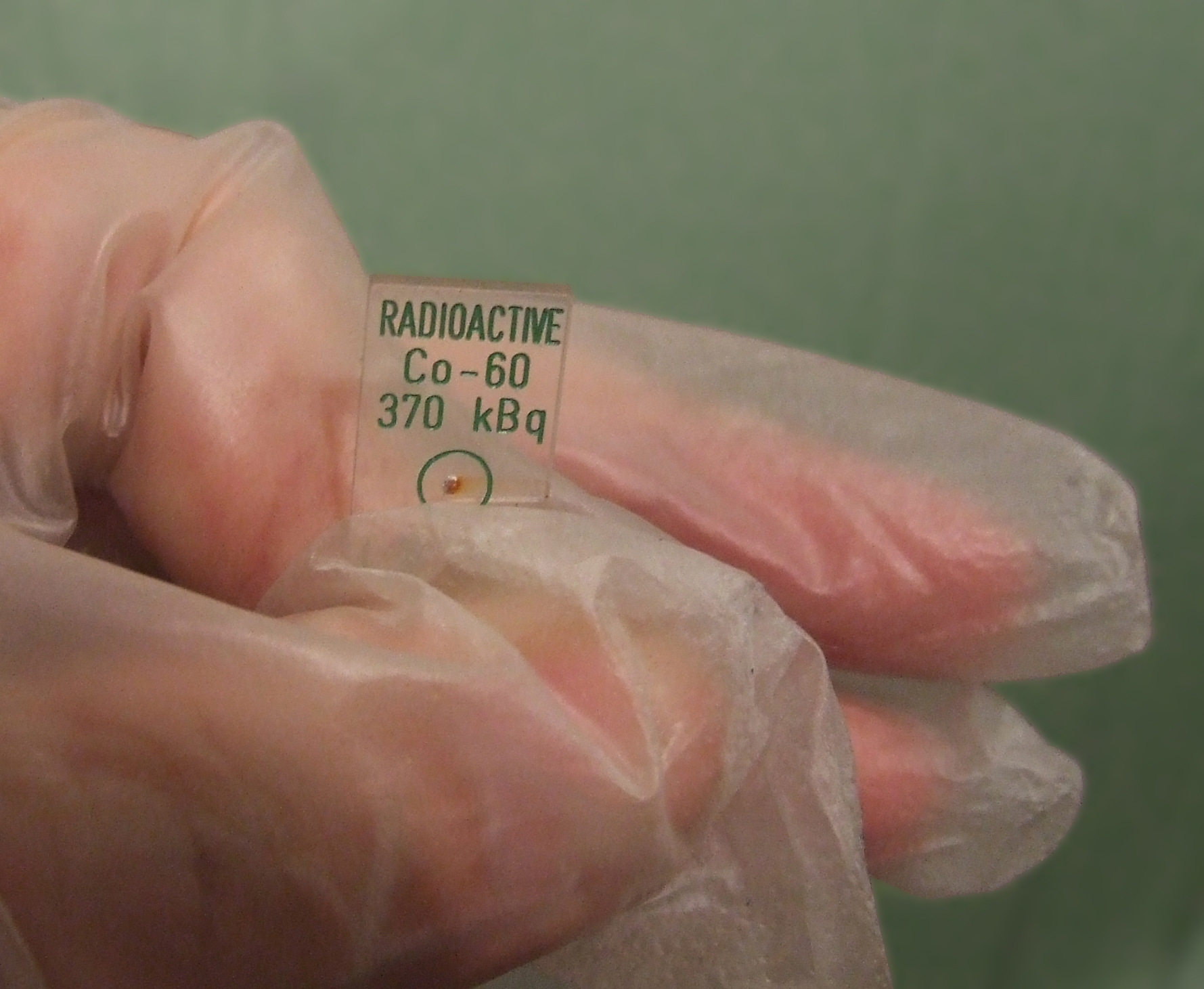
Radioactive source ^{60}Co, activity 370 kBq (10 μCi).

Because of the activity of manufactured ^{60}Co sources, their radioactivity can present a severe hazard to humans, and can cause death (potentially in less than an hour from acute exposure).

After entering a living mammal (such as a human), assuming that the subject does not die shortly after exposure (as may happen in acute exposure incidents), some of the ^{60}Co is excreted in feces. The rest is taken up by tissues, mainly the liver, kidneys, and bones, where the prolonged exposure to gamma radiation can cause cancer. Over time, the absorbed cobalt is eliminated in urine.

=== Steel contamination ===
Cobalt is found in steel. Uncontrolled disposal of ^{60}Co in scrap metal is responsible for the radioactivity in some iron products.

Circa 1983, construction was finished of 1700 apartments in Taiwan which were built with steel contaminated with cobalt-60. About 10,000 people occupied these buildings during a 9–20 year period. On average, these people unknowingly received a radiation dose of 0.4 Sv. Some studies have found that this large group did not suffer a higher incidence of cancer mortality, as the linear no-threshold model would predict, but suffered a lower cancer mortality than the general Taiwan public. These observations support the radiation hormesis model, however other studies have found health impacts that confound the results.

In August 2012, Petco recalled several models of steel pet food bowls after US Customs and Border Protection determined that they were emitting low levels of radiation, which was determined to be from ^{60}Co that had contaminated the steel.

In May 2013, a batch of metal-studded belts sold by online retailer ASOS were confiscated and held in a US radioactive storage facility after testing positive for ^{60}Co.

=== Incidents involving medical radiation sources ===
A radioactive contamination incident occurred in 1984 in Ciudad Juárez, Chihuahua, Mexico, originating from a radiation therapy unit illegally purchased by a private medical company and subsequently dismantled for lack of personnel to operate it. The radioactive material, ^{60}Co, ended up in a junkyard, where it was sold to foundries that inadvertently smelted it with other metals and produced about 6,000 tons of contaminated rebar. These were distributed in 17 Mexican states and several cities in the United States. It is estimated that 4,000 people were exposed to radiation as a result of this incident.

In the Samut Prakan radiation accident in 2000, a disused radiotherapy head containing a ^{60}Co source was stored at an unsecured location in Bangkok, Thailand and then accidentally sold to scrap collectors. Unaware of the danger, a junkyard employee dismantled the head and extracted the source, which remained unprotected for a period of days at the junkyard. Ten people, including the scrap collectors and workers at the junkyard, were exposed to high levels of radiation and became ill. Three junkyard workers later died of their exposure, which was estimated to be over 6 Gy. Afterward, the source was safely recovered by Thai authorities.

In December 2013, a truck carrying a disused 111 TBq ^{60}Co teletherapy source from a hospital in Tijuana to a radioactive waste storage center was hijacked at a gas station near Mexico City. The truck was soon recovered, but the thieves had removed the source from its shielding. It was found intact in a nearby field. Despite early reports with lurid headlines asserting that the thieves were "likely doomed", the radiation sickness was mild enough that the suspects were quickly released to police custody, and no one is known to have died from the incident.

=== Other incidents ===
On 13 September 1999, six people tried to steal ^{60}Co rods from a chemical plant in the city of Grozny, Chechen Republic, Russia. During the theft, the suspects opened the radioactive material container and handled it, resulting in the deaths of three of the suspects and injury of the remaining three. The suspect who held the material directly in his hands died of radiation exposure 30 minutes later. This incident is described as an attempted theft, but some of the rods are reportedly still missing.

== Parity ==
In 1957, Chien-Shiung Wu et al. discovered that β-decay violated parity, implying nature (the weak force) sees handedness. In the Wu experiment, researchers aligned ^{60}Co nuclei by cooling the source to low temperatures in a magnetic field. Wu's observation was that more β-rays were emitted in the opposite direction to the nuclear spin. This asymmetry violates parity conservation.

== Suppliers ==
Argentina, Canada, India and Russia are the largest suppliers of ^{60}Co in the world. Both Argentina and Canada have (as of 2022) an all-heavy-water reactor fleet for power generation. Canada has CANDU in numerous locations throughout Ontario as well as Point Lepreau Nuclear Generating Station in New Brunswick, while Argentina has two German-supplied heavy water reactors at Atucha nuclear power plant and a Canadian-built CANDU at Embalse Nuclear Power Station. India has CANDU reactors at the Rajasthan Atomic Power Station used for producing ^{60}Co. India had a capacity of more than 6 MCi of ^{60}Co production in 2021; this capacity is slated to increase with more CANDU reactors being commissioned at the Rajasthan Atomic Power Station. Heavy-water reactors are particularly well suited for production of ^{60}Co because of their excellent neutron economy and because their capacity for online refueling allows targets to be inserted into the reactor core and removed after a predetermined time without the need for cold shutdown.

== In popular culture ==
^{60}Co is the material encasing a massive nuclear warhead attached to a missile called the Alpha-Omega Doomsday Bomb in the film Beneath the Planet of the Apes (1970).

In an episode of 9-1-1 (TV series), a truck illegally transporting ^{60}Co causes a hazardous emergency for a team of firefighters.

In the 1959 film, City of Fear, ^{60}Co is central to the plot in which an escaped convict obtains the material, believing it to be heroin and endangering the city of Los Angeles.

== See also ==
- Cobalt bomb
- Harold E. Johns

Lighter: cobalt-59	Cobalt-60 is an isotope of cobalt	Heavier: cobalt-61
Decay product of: iron-60	Decay chain of cobalt-60	Decays to: nickel-60
