= MGD =

MGD may stand for:

- Maharani Gayatri Devi Girls’ Public School, Jaipur, India
- Miller Genuine Draft beer, Miller Brewing Company
- Million gallons per day, a measurement of pumping rate
- Guildford railway station, Perth, Australia, station code
- Mean glandular dose, of radiation to the breast
- Meibomian gland dysfunction, an eye disease
- Minggang East railway station, China Railway pinyin code MGD
