= Mean glandular dose =

Amount of radiation absorbed by a breast during mammography

In mammography, mean glandular dose (MGD) is a quantity used to describe the absorbed dose of radiation to the breast. It is based on a measurement of air kerma and conversion factors. MGD can be calculated from measurements made with poly(methyl methacrylate) (PMMA) blocks. It is often used to compare typical doses to patients between different centres or internationally, and is the preferred measure of the potential risk from mammography.

== Calculation ==
MGD can be calculated from a measured incident air kerma at the top of the breast, $K$, as follows:

$D=Kgcs$

$g$ converts from incident air kerma to MGD, with a glandularity of 50%, based on breast thickness and HVL. $c$ corrects for glandularity other than 50%, depending on the breast thickness and HVL, with two versions for ages 50–64 and 40–49. $s$ corrects for the x-ray spectra in use with a table of target/filter combinations.

== Applications ==
MGD is typically used to define limits on mammography exposures by national and international organisations such as the European Union and International Atomic Energy Agency, at <2.5 milligray (mGy) per exposure to a standard breast (4.5 cm PMMA).

In routine quality assurance testing of mammographic equipment, MGD measurements for a range of effective breast thicknesses with PMMA, and from real patient exposures, is widely recommended.
