= Line focus principle =

Illustration of the line focus principle

The Line focus principle refers to the physical phenomenon governing the relative width of input excited radiation to what is output. This is particularly relevant to spot size (w naught) calculations and manifests most acutely in radiation of shorter wavelengths, such as X-Rays.

== X-ray generation ==
X-rays are produced when electrons are accelerated or decelerated. (This is why young children are warned to keep their distance from CRT televisions). Tungsten is a good source for producing this kind of radiation due to its high atomic number and high melting point. The high-energy electrons formed in the cathode side of an X-ray tube can interact with the electrons of a tungsten target on the anode side and produce ionized radiation or white radiation.

When an electron is attracted toward the energy of the tungsten nucleus, the electron will either slow down, losing some of its energy and deviate from its original path (bremsstrahlung) or knock out and replace an existing electron orbiting the nucleus (characteristic radiation). The energy difference that is lost when the electron slows down in the first reaction or the difference in energy between the original electron and the one replacing it in the second reaction is released as an X-ray photon. This radiation is referred to as ionized or white radiation.

The voltage applied across the X-ray tube establishes the kinetic energy of the electrons when they strike the target.

When voltage is applied, the temperature of the cathode establishes the rate of electron emission (current). The temperature of the filament is controlled by adjusting the voltage applied across the filament (the current passed through the filament).

== X-ray generators ==
Generators supply power to the X-ray tube by way of electrodes that are responsible for generating and directing the flow electrons that are sealed in a vacuum for the purpose of controlling the speed of the electron stream (low voltage) and the speed of the anode target (high voltage). The cathode is negatively charged and consists of a focusing cup made of nickel and two filaments made of tungsten.

The filament is a coil of tungsten of a specified size (usual large and small). When current passes through the wire, heat is produced and causes the filament to release or burn off electrons. This is known as thermionic emission. The electrons are then compressed or focused by the focusing cup into a cloud known as a space charge.

High-voltage is applied to the anode on the opposite side of the tube, creating positive electrical potential (voltage) that attracts the negative electrons and sends the electrons hurtling across the tube with kinetic energy. The electrons then strike the anode target, forcing the electrons to interact with the electrons of the anode target and rapidly decelerate. The kinetic energy of the electrons is converted into heat and radiation (X-ray photons) due to these interactions. Most of the energy carried by the electrons is converted to heat (99%). Only 1% is converted into radiation or X-rays. In order to assist with the dissipation of such high heat, a larger focal spot or focal track is needed. This is achieved by increasing the area of the focal spot with a rotating anode usually made of tungsten also because of its high melting point.

== Heel effect ==
In general, an X-ray's beam intensity is not uniform. When it focuses to a target, a conical shape appears (divergent beam). The intensity of the beam from the positive anode side is lower than the intensity from the negative cathode side because the photons created when the electrons strike the target have a longer way to travel through the rotating target on the anode side. This effect is called the anode heel effect and is why thicker body parts should be placed under the cathode side of the tube for better penetration. Images needing high detail require a smaller focal size and therefore a smaller focal angle (extremities). Larger focal spots require a larger angle (chest and abdomen).

== Line focus principle ==
The X-ray take-off angle, through foreshortening, makes the oblong focal spot effectively a round focal spot (for most purposes), when considering the rays that exit through the X-ray tube's aperture.
