= Maximar-100 =

The Maximar-100 is a radiation therapy device that was made by General Electric to deliver superficial x-rays.

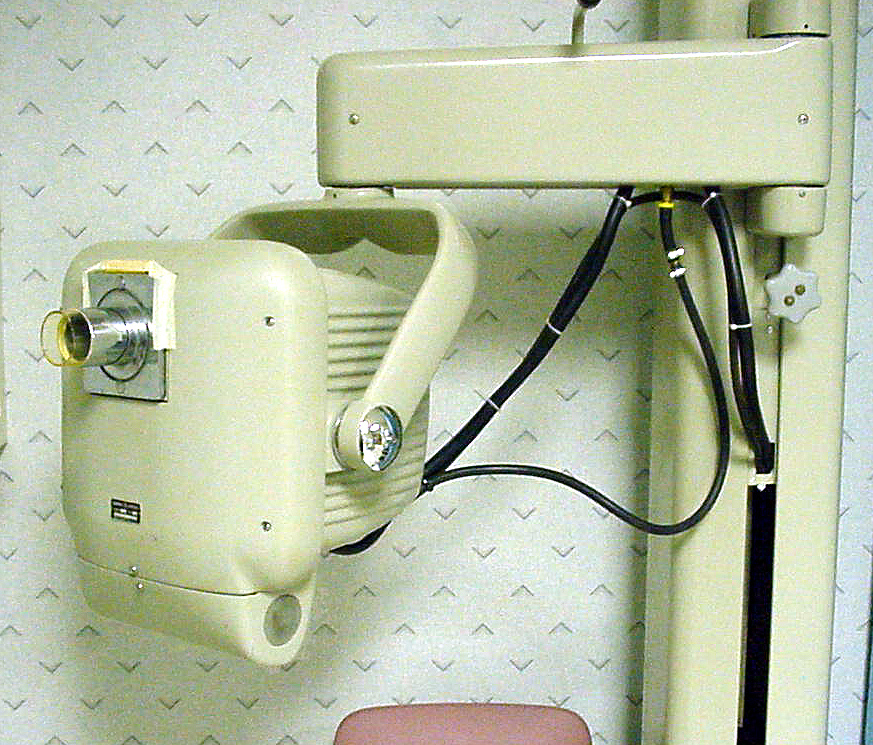
Maximar 100 X-Ray Unit Superficial Therapy

The Maximar-100's x-ray source is the GE SRT-1, an x-ray tube specifically designed for use in the Maximar-100. This is a fixed-anode, reflection-type x-ray tube, whose name is composed of three parts: "SR" meaning self-rectified, "T" meaning therapeutic, and "1" indicating a 1-mm diameter nominal focal spot size. Its beryllium window produces a beam with very low inherent filtration but it is subject to beam non-uniformity due to heel effect.

The generator produces a voltage that is continuously adjustable between 30 and 100 kVp and a continuously adjustable current between 0 and 5 mA. An analog indicator and rheostat is provided allowing for feedback, so adjustments can be made to compensate for drift during treatment.

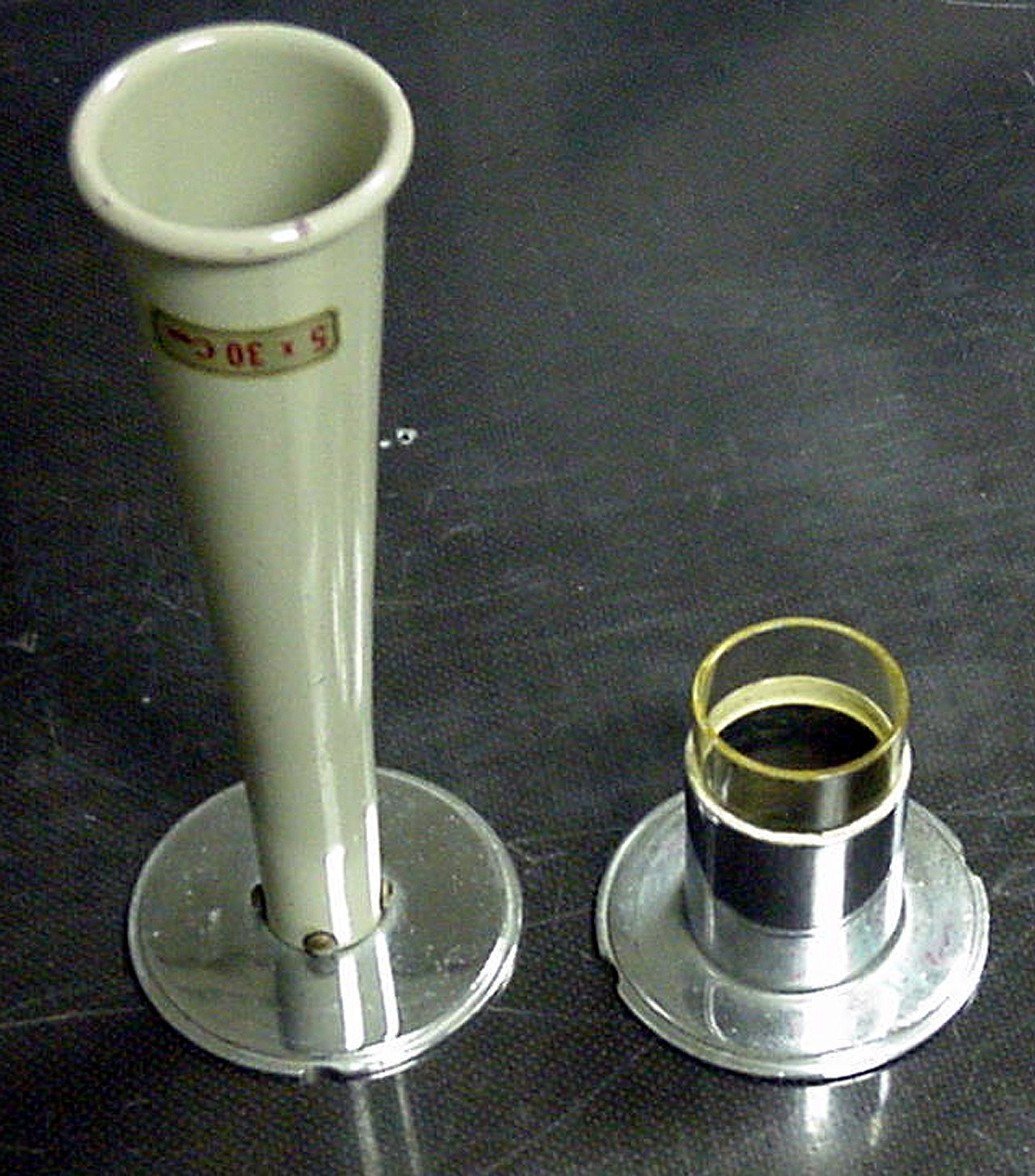
Maximar 100 X-Ray Unit Superficial Therapy - Cones

The unit uses a set of interchangeable aluminum filters of 0.25, 0.5, 1, 2, and 3 mm thickness which filter the beam's spectrum, but also substantially effects its intensity. Collimation is achieved using two sets of open ended circular applicators. The first are cylindrical and provide fields of 1, 1.5, 2, 3, 4, and 5 cm diameter at a 15 cm source-to-skin distance. The second are conical and provide fields of 5, 10, 15, and 20 cm diameter at a 30 cm source-to-skin distance.

The unit was first manufactured in 1953 and proved durable. It was rated for a 50% duty cycle, i.e. 4 hours of operation at full power, 100 kVp and 5 mA, in any 8 hour period. As of 2022, at least one unit had been in clinical service continually since 1953. Where this unit has been replaced by newer technology, it remains a clinical touchstone and basis for comparison.
