= Cobalt therapy =

Medical use of gamma rays

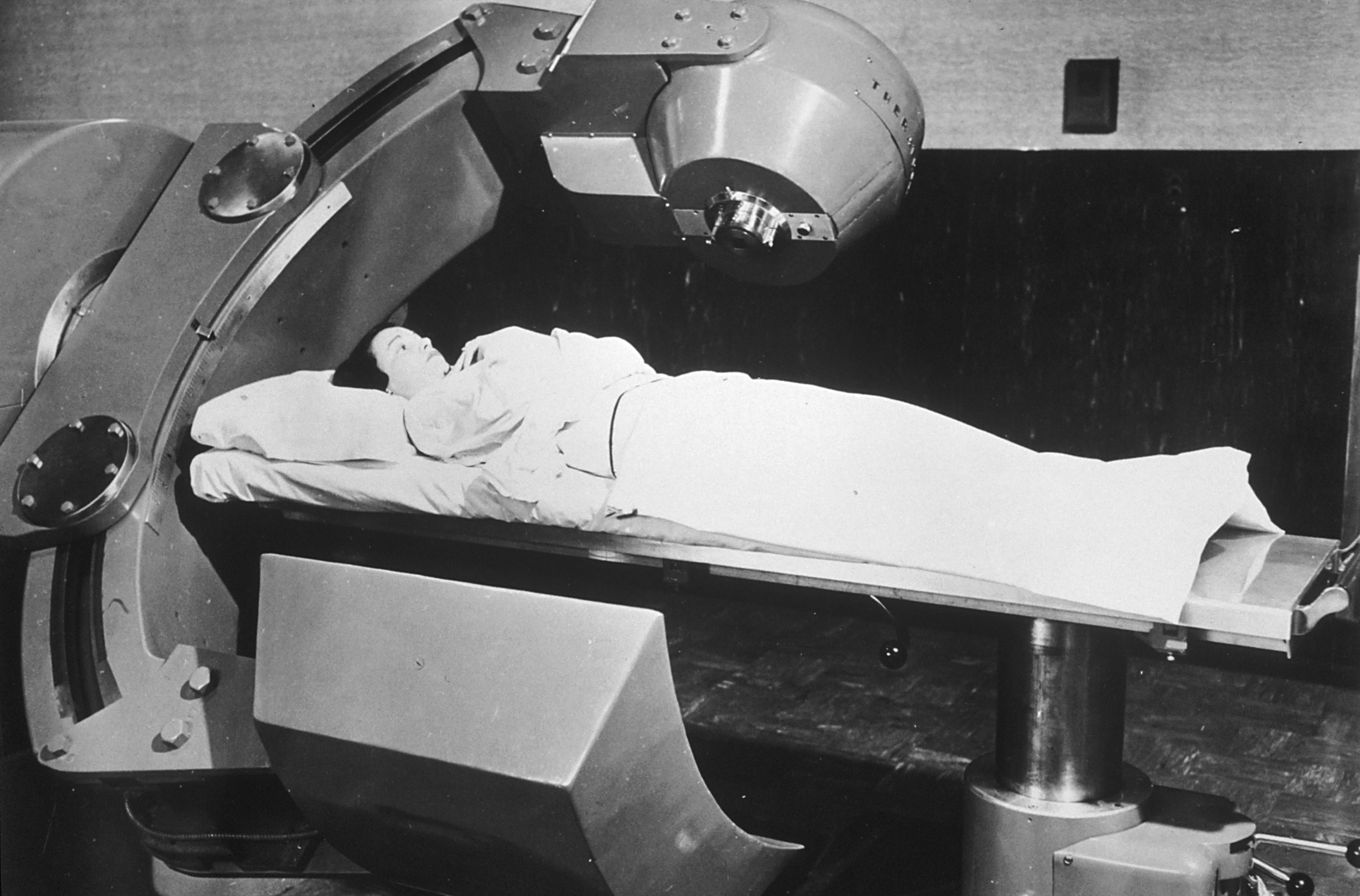
- Other names: Cobalt-60 therapy
- Specialty: Oncology

Cobalt therapy is the medical use of gamma rays from the radioisotope cobalt-60 to treat conditions such as cancer. Beginning in the 1950s, cobalt-60 was widely used in external beam radiotherapy (teletherapy) machines, which produced a beam of gamma rays which was directed into the patient's body to kill tumor tissue. Because these "cobalt machines" were expensive and required specialist support, they were often housed in "cobalt units". Cobalt therapy was a revolutionary advance in radiotherapy in the post-World War II period but is now being replaced by other technologies such as linear accelerators.

== History ==
Before the development of medical linear accelerators in the 1970s, the only artificial radiation source used for teletherapy was the x-ray tube. Researchers found ordinary x-ray tubes, which used voltages of 50-150 keV, could treat superficial tumors, but did not have the energy to reach tumors deep in the body. To have the penetrating ability to reach deep-seated tumors without subjecting healthy tissue to dangerous radiation doses required rays with energy around a million electron volts (MeV), called "megavoltage" radiation. To produce a significant amount of MeV x-rays required potentials on the tube of 3-5 million volts (3-5 megavolts), necessitating huge, expensive x-ray machines. By the late 1930s these were being built, but they were available at only a few hospitals.

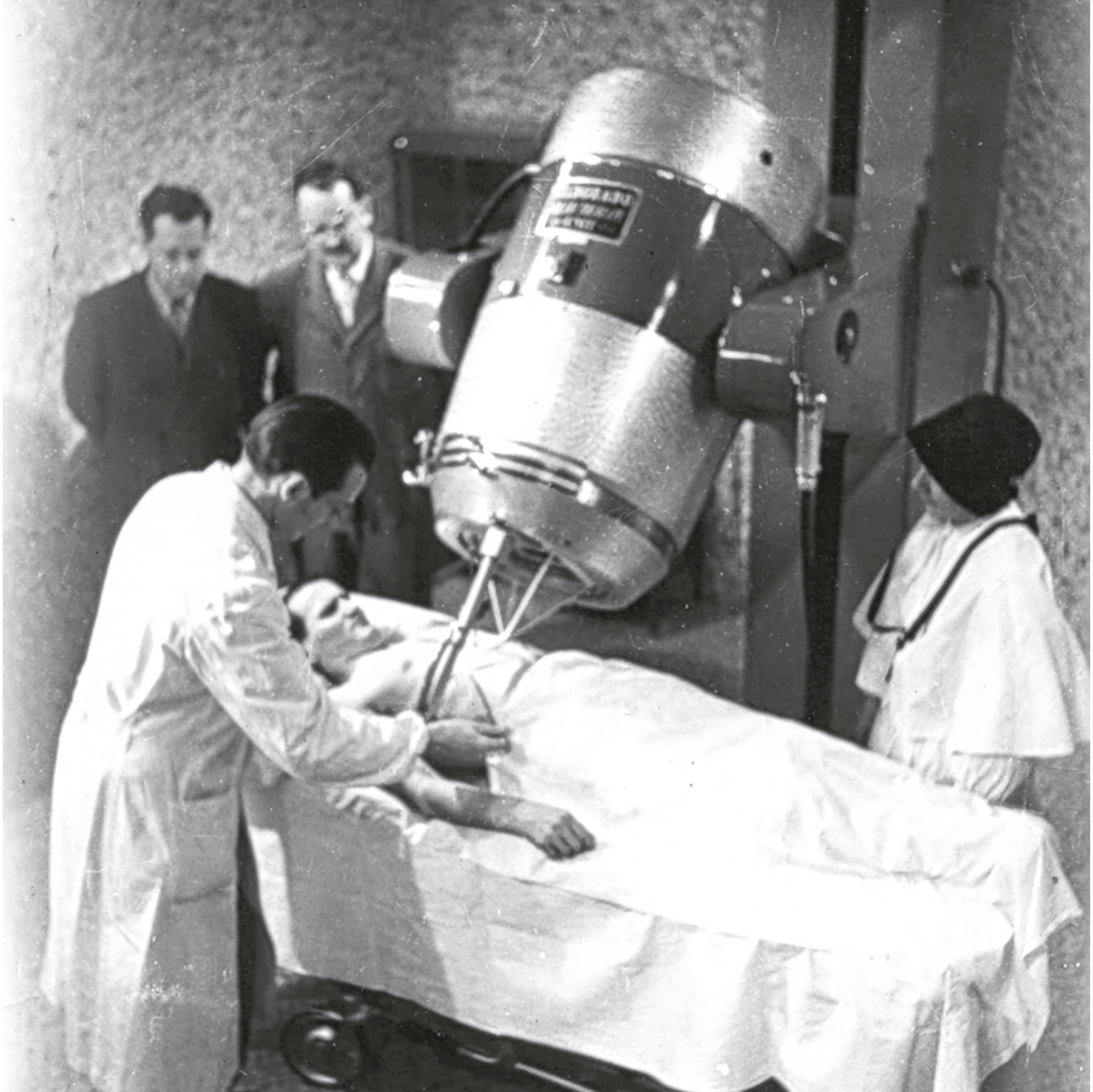
The first cobalt machine in Italy, installed in Borgo Valsugana in 1953

Radioisotopes produced gamma rays in the megavolt range, but prior to World War II virtually the only radioisotope available for radiotherapy was naturally occurring radium (producing 1-2 MeV gamma rays), which was extremely expensive due to its low occurrence in ores. In 1937 the price of radium US$25,000 (equivalent to $559,896 in 2025) per gram, and the total worldwide supply of radium available for beam radiotherapy (teletherapy) was 50 grams.

The invention of the nuclear reactor in the Manhattan Project during World War II made possible the creation of artificial radioisotopes for radiotherapy. Cobalt-60, produced by neutron irradiation of ordinary cobalt metal in a reactor, is a high activity gamma-ray emitter, emitting 1.17 and 1.33 MeV gamma rays with an activity of 44 TBq/g (1,200 Ci/g). The main reason for its wide use in radiotherapy is that it has a longer half-life, 5.27 years, than many other gamma emitters. However, this half-life still requires cobalt sources to be replaced about every five years.

In 1949, Dr. Harold E. Johns of the University of Saskatchewan sent a request to the National Research Council (NRC) of Canada asking it to produce cobalt-60 isotopes for use in a cobalt therapy unit prototype. Two cobalt-60 apparatuses were then built, one in Saskatoon in the cancer wing of the University of Saskatchewan and the other in London, Ontario. Johns collected depth-dose data at the University of Saskatchewan which would later become the world standard. The first patient to be treated with cobalt-60 radiation was treated on October 27, 1951, at the War Memorial Children's Hospital in London, Ontario. In 1961 cobalt therapy was expected to replace X-ray radiotherapy. In 1966, Walt Disney's lung cancer was treated with this procedure, but could not prevent his death.

Dr. Glenn T. Seaborg, chairman of the United States Atomic Energy Commission, Nobel Prize winner and former chancellor of the University of California, dedicated the first cobalt facility of the new Radiation Therapy and Nuclear Medicine Wing of the Cedars of Lebanon Hospital on January 11, 1963, supervised by Dr. Henry L. Jaffe, Director of the new department. A pioneer in the use of the nicknamed "cobalt bomb" the Cedars unit was licensed in 1948 by the Atomic Energy Commission.

== Current use ==
The role of the cobalt unit has partly been replaced by the linear accelerator, which can generate higher-energy radiation, and does not produce the radioactive waste that radioisotopes do with their attendant disposal problems. Cobalt treatment still has a useful role to play in certain applications and is still in widespread use worldwide, since the machinery is relatively reliable and simple to maintain compared to the modern linear accelerator.

== Isotope ==
As used in radiotherapy, cobalt units produce stable, dichromatic beams of 1.17 and 1.33 MeV, resulting in an average beam energy of 1.25 MeV. Cobalt-60 has a half-life of 5.2713 years.

== See also ==
- Gamma knife
