= Megavoltage X-rays =

High energy (>1MeV) X-rays

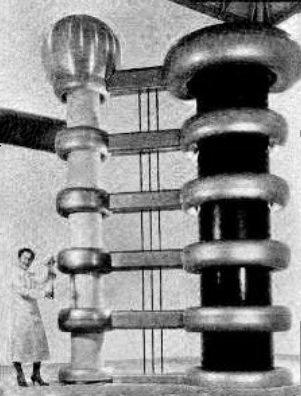
- Early megavolt x-ray machine installed at Los Angeles Institute of Radiotherapy, 1938. Before linacs, high voltage x-ray tubes (left column) powered by million volt transformers (right column) were used to produce penetrating x-rays
- ICD-9: 92.24

Megavoltage X-rays are produced by linear accelerators ("linacs") operating at voltages in excess of 1000 kV (1 MV) range, and therefore have an energy in the MeV range. The voltage in this case refers to the voltage used to accelerate electrons in the linear accelerator and indicates the maximum possible energy of the photons which are subsequently produced. They are used in medicine in external beam radiotherapy to treat neoplasms, cancer and tumors. Beams with a voltage range of 4-25 MV are used to treat deeply buried cancers because radiation oncologists find that they penetrate well to deep sites within the body. Lower energy x-rays, called orthovoltage X-rays, are used to treat cancers closer to the surface.

Megavoltage x-rays are preferred for the treatment of deep lying tumours as they are attenuated less than lower energy photons, and will penetrate further, with a lower skin dose. Megavoltage X-rays also have lower relative biological effectiveness than orthovoltage x-rays. These properties help to make megavoltage x-rays the most common beam energies typically used for radiotherapy in modern techniques such as IMRT.

== History ==
The use of megavoltage x-rays for treatment first became widespread with the use of Cobalt-60 machines in the 1950s. However prior to this other devices had been capable of producing megavoltage radiation, including the 1930s Van de Graaff generator and betatron.

== See also ==
- Orthovoltage X-rays
- External beam radiotherapy
