= Orthovoltage X-rays =

High energy (100–500 KeV) X-rays

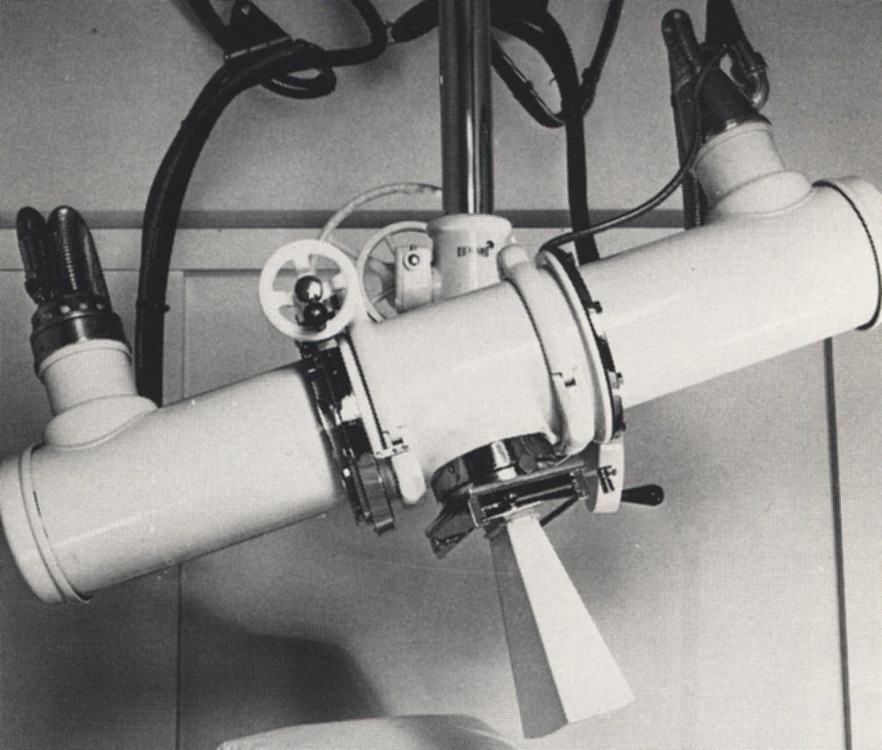
- A 200 kV orthovoltage X-ray tube used for radiation therapy, 1938. Orthovoltage X-ray machines are similar to diagnostic (radiography) X-ray machines, except that higher voltages are used and the X-ray tube is longer, to prevent the high voltages from arcing across the tube. ICD10 =
- ICD-9: 92.22
- OPS-301 code: 8-521

Orthovoltage X-rays are produced by X-ray tubes operating at voltages in the 100–500 kV range, and therefore the X-rays have a peak energy in the 100–500 keV range. Orthovoltage X-rays are sometimes termed "deep" X-rays (DXR). They cover the upper limit of energies used for diagnostic radiography, and are used in external beam radiotherapy to treat cancer and tumors. They penetrate tissue to a useful depth of about 4–6 cm. This makes them useful for treating skin, superficial tissues, and ribs, but not for deeper structures such as lungs or pelvic organs. The relatively low energy of orthovoltage X-rays causes them to interact with matter via different physical mechanisms compared to higher energy megavoltage X-rays or radionuclide γ-rays, increasing their relative biological effectiveness.

== History ==
The energy and penetrating ability of the X-rays produced by an X-ray tube increases with the voltage on the tube. External beam radiotherapy began around the turn of the 20th century with ordinary diagnostic X-ray tubes, which used voltages below 150 kV. Physicians found that these were adequate for treating superficial tumors, but not tumors inside the body. Since these low energy X-rays were mostly absorbed in the first few centimeters of tissue, to deliver a large enough radiation dose to buried tumors would cause severe skin burns.

Therefore beginning in the 1920s "orthovoltage" 200–500 kV X-ray machines were built. These were found to be able to reach shallow tumors, but to treat tumors deep in the body more voltage was needed. By the 1930s and 1940s megavoltage X-rays produced by huge machines with 3–5 million volts on the tube, began to be employed. With the introduction of linear accelerators in the 1970s, which could produce 4–30 MV beams, orthovoltage X-rays are now considered quite shallow.

== See also ==
- Megavoltage X-rays
