= Radiation oncologist =

Doctor specializing in radiation therapy to treat cancer

A radiation oncologist is a specialist physician who uses ionizing radiation (such as megavoltage X-rays or radionuclides) in the treatment of cancer. Radiation oncology is one of the three primary specialties, the other two being surgical and medical oncology, involved in the treatment of cancer. Radiation can be given as a curative modality, either alone or in combination with surgery and/or chemotherapy. It may also be used palliatively, to relieve symptoms in patients with incurable cancers. A radiation oncologist may also use radiation to treat some benign diseases, including benign tumors. In some countries (not the United States), radiotherapy and chemotherapy are controlled by a single oncologist who is a "clinical oncologist". Radiation oncologists work closely with other physicians such as surgical oncologists, interventional radiologists, internal medicine subspecialists, and medical oncologists, as well as medical physicists and technicians as part of the multi-disciplinary cancer team. Radiation oncologists undergo four years of oncology-specific training whereas oncologists who deliver chemotherapy have two years of additional training in cancer care during fellowship after internal medicine residency in the United States.

== Training (by country) ==
=== United States ===
In the United States, radiation oncologists undergo four years of residency (in addition to an internship), which is more dedicated to oncology training than any other medical specialty. During the four years of post-graduate training, residents learn about clinical oncology, the physics and biology of ionizing radiation, and the treatment of cancer patients with radiation. After completion of this training, a radiation oncologist may undergo certification by the American Board of Radiology (ABR). Board certification includes three written tests and an oral examination which is given only once per year. The written tests include separate exams in radiation physics, and radiobiology, clinical oncology, which is followed by an eight-part oral examination given in the late spring one year into practice. Successfully passing these tests leads to the granting of a time-limited board certification. Recertification is obtained via a series of continuing medical education and practice qualifications including a written exam, clinical practice parameter evaluation, continuing medical education credits, and meeting community practice standards.

=== India ===
Radiotherapy training in India encompasses the treatment of solid tumors in terms of Chemotherapy, radiation therapy, and palliative care in most states. Postgraduate MD degree is awarded after 3 years of post-MBBS in-service comprehensive training and a final university level exam. MD Radiation oncology practitioners are the most proficient oncologists in India delivering radiotherapy and chemotherapy. The first Department of Radiotherapy in India was set up on 25 January 1910 at Calcutta Medical College in the state of West Bengal and is still a leading oncology training center of India.

=== Canada ===
Radiation Oncology training in Canada is very similar to the United States. Radiation oncologists directly enter radiation oncology residencies of 5 years duration, with the first year as an internship year. During the next four years, residents complete intensive training in clinical oncology, in radiophysics and radiobiology, and in the treatment planning and delivery of radiotherapy. Most radiation oncologists also pursue a fellowship after their residency, examples of which include brachytherapy, intensity modulated radiation therapy (IMRT), gynecologic radiation oncology, and many others. Radiation oncologists in Canada commonly treat two or three different anatomic sites, such as head and neck, breast, genitourinary, hematologic, gynecologic, central nervous system, or lung cancer.

=== United Kingdom ===
In the United Kingdom, clinical oncologists, who practise radiotherapy are also fully qualified to administer chemotherapy. After completion of their basic medical degree, all oncologists must train fully in general internal medicine and pass the MRCP exam, normally 3–4 years after qualification. Following this, 5 years of Specialist Registrar (SpR) training is required in all non-surgical aspects of oncology in a recognised training program. During this time, the trainee must pass the FRCR examination in order to qualify for specialist registration as a clinical oncologist. A significant proportion of trainees will extend their time to undertake an academic fellowship, MD, or PhD. Almost all consultant clinical oncologists in the UK are Fellows of the Royal College of Radiologists, the governing body of the specialty. Whilst most oncologists will treat a selection of common general oncology cases, there is increasing specialisation, with the expectation that consultants will specialise in one or two subsites.

=== Australia and New Zealand ===
In Australia and New Zealand, The Royal Australian and New Zealand College of Radiologists (RANZCR Home | RANZCR) awards a Fellowship (FRANZCR) to trainees after a 5-year program and several sets of exams and modules. As in other countries, radiation oncologists tend to subspecialize although generalists will always exist in smaller centres. Although trained in the delivery of chemotherapy, radiation oncologists in Australia and New Zealand rarely prescribe it.

=== Iran ===
In Iran, radiation oncologists, who are trained in non-surgical aspects of oncology (including radiation therapy) directly enter a 5-year residency program after completion of 7 years of training in general medicine and acceptance in national comprehensive residency exam.

=== Nepal ===
In Nepal, only Bir Hospital runs residency program on Radiation Oncology, under NAMS. It's a 3 years residency program, and the main domains are Chemotherapy, Radiotherapy and Palliative Care.

=== Spain ===
In Spain Radiation Oncology Specialists undertake a 4 year specialization program and are recognized to apply both ionizing radiation therapies and chemotherapy. Most fellows follow the policies emerged from leading national society SEOR (Sociedad Española de Oncología Radioterápica).

== Role of the Radiation oncologist ==
The Radiation oncologist is responsible for preparing the treatment plan where the radiation is required. Some of the treatment methods are radioactive implantations, external beam radiotherapy, hyperthermia, and combined modality therapy such as radiotherapy with surgery, chemotherapy, or immunotherapy.

== Equipment ==
To provide the treatment correctly, a series of equipment is needed which will help to complement it. First, a simulator and treatment preparation must be carried out. This consists of locating the area where the tumor is located to know where exactly the patient will be exposed at the time of treatment. The equipment used to perform this work is a computed tomography (CT) scan, a Magnetic resonance imaging (MRI), and an X-ray. Subsequently, the site targeted for treatment is marked and an immobilizer is created which helps to limit exposure another body area to the radiation. To complement this immobilizer staff will employ tape, foam sponges, headrests, molds and plaster casts. When treatment is in the head and neck area a thermoplastic mask is employed. This mask is precisely molded to the patient's shape and secured it to fasteners on the treatment table. This improves patient stability. When the treatment plan is complete, the patient will be assigned (depending upon the type of cancer and its stage) appointments to perform the therapy and monitoring.

== See also ==
- Radiation therapy (radiotherapy)
- Oncology
- Medical Physics
