= X-ray filter =

Material placed in front of an X-ray source

An X-ray filter (or compensating filter) is a device placed in front of an X-ray source in order to reduce the intensity of (i.e. attenuate) particular wavelengths from its spectrum and selectively alter the distribution of X-ray wavelengths within a given beam before reaching the image receptor. Adding a filtration device to certain x-ray examinations attenuates the x-ray beam by eliminating lower energy x-ray photons, which produces a clearer image with greater anatomic detail to better visualize differences in tissue densities. This is also known as "beam hardening"; higher energy x-rays are called "hard", while lower energy x-rays are called "soft". A compensating filter provides a better radiographic image by removing lower energy photons, while also reducing the radiation dose to the patient.

When X-rays hit matter, part of the incoming beam is transmitted through the material and part of it is absorbed by the material. The amount absorbed is dependent on the material's mass absorption coefficient and tends to decrease for incident photons of greater energy. True absorption occurs when X-rays of sufficient energy cause electron energy level transitions in the atoms of the absorbing material. The energy from these X-rays are used to excite the atoms and do not continue past the material (thus being "filtered" out). Because of this, despite the general trend of decreased absorption at higher energy wavelengths, there are periodic spikes in the absorption characteristics of any given material corresponding to each of the atomic energy level transitions. These spikes are called absorption edges. The result is that every material preferentially filters out x-rays corresponding to and slightly above their electron energy levels, while generally allowing X-rays with energies slightly less than these levels to transmit through relatively unscathed.

Therefore, it is possible to selectively fine tune which wavelengths of x-rays are present in a beam by matching materials with particular absorption characteristics to different X-ray source spectra.

== Applications ==
For example, a copper X-ray source may preferentially produce a beam of x-rays with wavelengths 154 and 139 picometres. Nickel has an absorption edge at 149 pm, between the two copper lines. Thus, using nickel as a filter for copper would result in the absorption of the slightly higher energy 139 pm x-rays, while letting the 154 pm rays through without a significant decrease in intensity. Thus, a copper X-ray source with a nickel filter can produce a nearly monochromatic X-ray beam with photons of mostly 154 pm.

For medical purposes, X-ray filters are used to selectively attenuate, or block out, low-energy rays during x-ray imaging (radiography). Low energy x-rays (less than 30 keV) contribute little to the resultant image as they are heavily absorbed by the patient's soft tissues (particularly the skin). Additionally, this absorption adds to the risk of stochastic (e.g. cancer) or non stochastic radiation effects (e.g. tissue reactions) in the patient. Thus, it is favorable to remove these low energy X-rays from the incident light beam. X-ray filtration may be inherent due to the X-ray tube and housing material itself or added from additional sheets of filter material. The minimum filtration used is usually 2.5 mm aluminium (Al) equivalent, although there is an increasing trend to use greater filtration. Manufacturers of modern fluoroscopy equipment utilize a system of adding a variable thickness of copper (Cu) filtration according to patient thickness. This typically ranges from 0.1 to 0.9 mm Cu.

The need for selectively attenuating x-rays in radiography is due to the differences in densities across anatomic regions of the body. Less dense regions or tissues (lungs, sinuses) show up darker or black on x-rays while more dense tissues (bones, calcification) present as white or shades of grey. For instance, the thoracic spine, when imaged for an anterior-posterior (AP or from front to back) projection, lies between both lung fields. The lungs have a very low attenuation value because they are air-filled and show up as dark areas on radiographs, while the thoracic spine is bony with higher attenuation and displays as white or grey. The vast differences in density make it difficult to acquire a high quality, detailed x-ray unless a compensating filter is applied.

X-ray filters are commonly mounted to the collimator (collimator-mounted) of an x-ray machine, where the photon beam exits the x-ray tube. However, there are non-attachable compensating filters called contact filters that are either placed on or behind the patient. Contact filters placed between the patient and the image receptor, where the photons that pass through the patient are recorded to form an image, do not limit radiation dose to the patient.

X-ray filters are also used for X-ray diffraction, in determinations of the interatomic spaces of crystalline solids. These lattice spacings can be determined using Bragg diffraction, but this technique requires scans to be done with approximately monochromatic X-ray beams. Thus, filter set ups like the copper nickel system described above are used to allow only a single X-ray wavelength to penetrate through to a target crystal, allowing the resulting scattering to determine the diffraction distance.

== Types of X-Ray Filters ==
=== Wedge ===
- Most common filter used in x-ray imaging
- Collimator mounted to the x-ray source
- Best used for long axis areas where tissue density widely differs
  - AP projection of the Thoracic Spine
  - Lateral projection of the Nasal Bones
  - AP Foot
  - AP Hip for emaciated patients

=== Trough ===
- Channel shape or double wedge
- Best for body parts where density would be higher in the center of the image and tissues are less dense at the edges
  - Posterior-Anterior (PA) Chest Projections
- Collimator mounted

=== Ferlic Swimmer's ===
- Collimator mounted
- Lateral Cervicothoracic (Swimmer's View)
- Axiolateral Hip Projection (Danelius-Miller)

=== Boomerang ===
- Contact Filter (placed between the anatomy to be imaged and the image receptor)
  - Radiation dose to the patient is not reduced as it is placed at a point where x-ray photons strike the patient before encountering the filter
- Designed for the shoulder but can also be beneficial for lateral facial bones

=== Scoliosis ===
- Used for full spine imaging
- PA projection uses a wedge filter over the cervical and thoracic spines to remove excess photons as a result of a higher dose required for the lumbar spine
- Lateral projection engages the use of a double wedge filter from the mid-thoracic region to the cervical spine

== Various elemental effects ==
Suitable for X-ray crystallography:

- Zirconium - Absorbs Bremsstrahlung & K-Beta.
- Iron - Absorbs the entire spectra.
- Molybdenum - Absorbs Bremsstrahlung - Leaving K-Beta & K-Alpha.
- Aluminium - 'Pinches' Bremsstrahlung* & Removes 3rd Generation peaks.
- Silver - Same as Aluminium, But to greater extent.
- Indium - Same as Iron, But to lesser extent.
- Copper - Same as Aluminium, Leaving only 1st Generation Peaks.

Suitable for Radiography:

- Molybdenum - Used in Mammography
- Rhodium - Used in Mammography with Rhodium anodes
- Aluminium - Used in general radiography x-ray tubes
- Copper - Used in general radiography - especially in paediatric applications.
- Silver - Used in Mammography with tungsten anode
- Tantalum - Used in fluoroscopy applications with tungsten anodes
- Niobium - Used in radiography and dental radiography with tungsten anodes
- Erbium - Used in radiography with tungsten anodes

Compensating filters used in general radiography are widely manufactured using aluminum due to its lightweight nature and its ability to effectively attenuate the x-ray beam. Plastics with high densities are a common compensating filter material, with clear leaded plastic (Clear-Pb) now being offered. While aluminum compensating filters attenuate x-ray photons, they also attenuate the light beam emitted through the collimator that allows the x-ray technologist to see exactly where the x-ray beam will strike the patient. Clear-Pb attenuates the x-ray beam but still allows collimator light to shine through the clear plastic, allowing the technologist to better visualize the intended area and still reducing the patient's radiation dose.

Notes:

- - Bremsstrahlung pinching is due to the atomic mass. The denser the atom, the higher the X-Ray Absorption. Only the higher energy X-Rays pass through the filter, appearing as if the Bremsstrahlung continuum had been pinched.
- - In this case, Mo appears to leave K-Alpha and K-Beta alone while absorbing the Bremsstrahlung. This is due to Mo absorbing all of the spectra's energy, but in doing so produces the same characteristic peaks as generated by the target.

== See also ==
- X-ray crystallography
- X-rays
- Bragg diffraction
