= Heel effect =

Phenomenon in X-ray tubes

An illustration of the heel effect in an x-ray tube

In X-ray tubes, the heel effect or, more precisely, the anode heel effect is a variation of the intensity of X-rays emitted by the anode depending on the direction of emission along the anode-cathode axis. X-rays emitted toward the anode are less intense than those emitted perpendicular to the cathode–anode axis or toward the cathode. The effect stems from the absorption of X-ray photons before they leave the anode in which they are produced. The probability of absorption depends on the distance the photons travel within the anode material, which in turn depends on the angle of emission relative to the anode surface.

== Factors ==
=== Source-to-image distance (SID) ===
The distance from the anode (the source of X-rays) to the image receptor influences the apparent magnitude of the anode heel effect. At short SID, image receptor captures a wider range of X-ray intensities than the same size image receptor at larger source–image distances (SID).

=== Beam width and receptor size ===
Wide X-ray beams can be cropped to narrow X-ray beams by use of a beam restricting device (variable-aperture X-ray "collimator", fixed aperture, or cone). A beam that is wide along the cathode–anode axis contains a wider range of X-ray intensities than a narrow beam. In a wide beam, a large image receptor captures a wider range of X-ray intensities than a small receptor (at the same SID). Both of these factors influence the visibility of the anode heel effect. A smaller field size results in a less pronounced heel effect.

=== Anode angle ===
When the angle of the anode is large, the usable X-ray photons do not have to travel through as much of the anode material to exit the tube. This results in a much less apparent anode heel effect, though the effective focal spot size is increased.

== Solutions ==
Almost all modern diagnostic X-ray generators exhibit heel effect. Graded intensity across the beam, generally a drawback, can be turned to advantage in some techniques by positioning the object or patient relative to the X-ray tube. For example, when imaging a foot, which is thicker at the ankle end than the toes, the toes should be positioned toward the anode and the ankle toward the cathode. Arbitrary intensity gradients can also be produced by placing a beam compensator (a wedge of homogeneous material) across the X-ray beam before exposure.

There have also been some efforts to eliminate the heel effect through automatic software adjustment of pixel values.
