= Half-value layer =

Thickness affecting radiation

A material's half-value layer (HVL), or half-value thickness, is the thickness of the material at which the intensity of radiation entering it is reduced by one half. HVL can also be expressed in terms of air kerma rate (AKR), rather than intensity: the half-value layer is the thickness of specified material that, "attenuates the beam of radiation to an extent such that the AKR is reduced to one-half of its original value. In this definition the contribution of all scattered radiation, other than any [...] present initially in the beam concerned, is deemed to be excluded." Rather than AKR, measurements of air kerma, exposure, or exposure rate can be used to determine half value layer, as long as it is given in the description.

Half-value layer refers to the first half-value layer, where subsequent (i.e. second) half-value layers refer to the amount of specified material that will reduce the air kerma rate by one-half after material has been inserted into the beam that is equal to the sum of all previous half-value layers.

Quarter-value layer is the amount of specified material that reduces the air kerma rate (or exposure rate, exposure, air kerma, etc...) to one fourth of the value obtained without any test filters. The quarter-value layer is equal to the sum of the first and second half-value layers.

The homogeneity factor (HF) describes the polychromatic nature of the beam and is given by:

$HF=\frac{1^{st} HVL}{2^{nd} HVL}$

The HF for a narrow beam will always be less than or equal to one (it is only equal to one in the case of a monoenergetic beam). In case of a narrow polychromatic beam, the HF is less than one because of beam hardening.

HVL is related to Mean free path, however the mean free path is the average distance a unit of radiation can travel in the material before being absorbed, whereas HVL is the average amount of material needed to absorb 50% of all radiation (i.e., to reduce the intensity of the incident radiation by half).

In the case of sound waves, HVL is the distance that it takes for the intensity of a sound wave to be reduced to one-half of its original value. The HVL of sound waves is determined by both the medium through which it travels, and the frequency of the beam. A "thin" half-value layer (or a quick drop of -3 dB) results from a high frequency sound wave and a medium with a high rate of attenuation, such as bone. HVL is measured in units of length.

A similar concept is the tenth-value layer or TVL. The TVL is the average amount of material needed to absorb 90% of all radiation, i.e., to reduce it to a tenth of the original intensity. 1 TVL is greater than or equal to log_{2}(10) or approximately 3.32 HVLs, with equality achieved for a monoenergetic beam.

Here are example approximate half-value layers for a variety of materials against a source of gamma rays, according to Iridium-192 radiation decay energy (MeV): Beta 0.67 (49%); Gamma 0.308 (28%); Gamma 0.468 (46%):

- Concrete: 44.5 mm
- Steel: 12.7 mm
- Lead: 4.8 mm
- Tungsten: 3.3 mm
- Uranium: 2.8 mm

== See also ==
- Attenuation coefficient
- Radiation protection
