= Brian W. Pogue =

American biomedical engineer

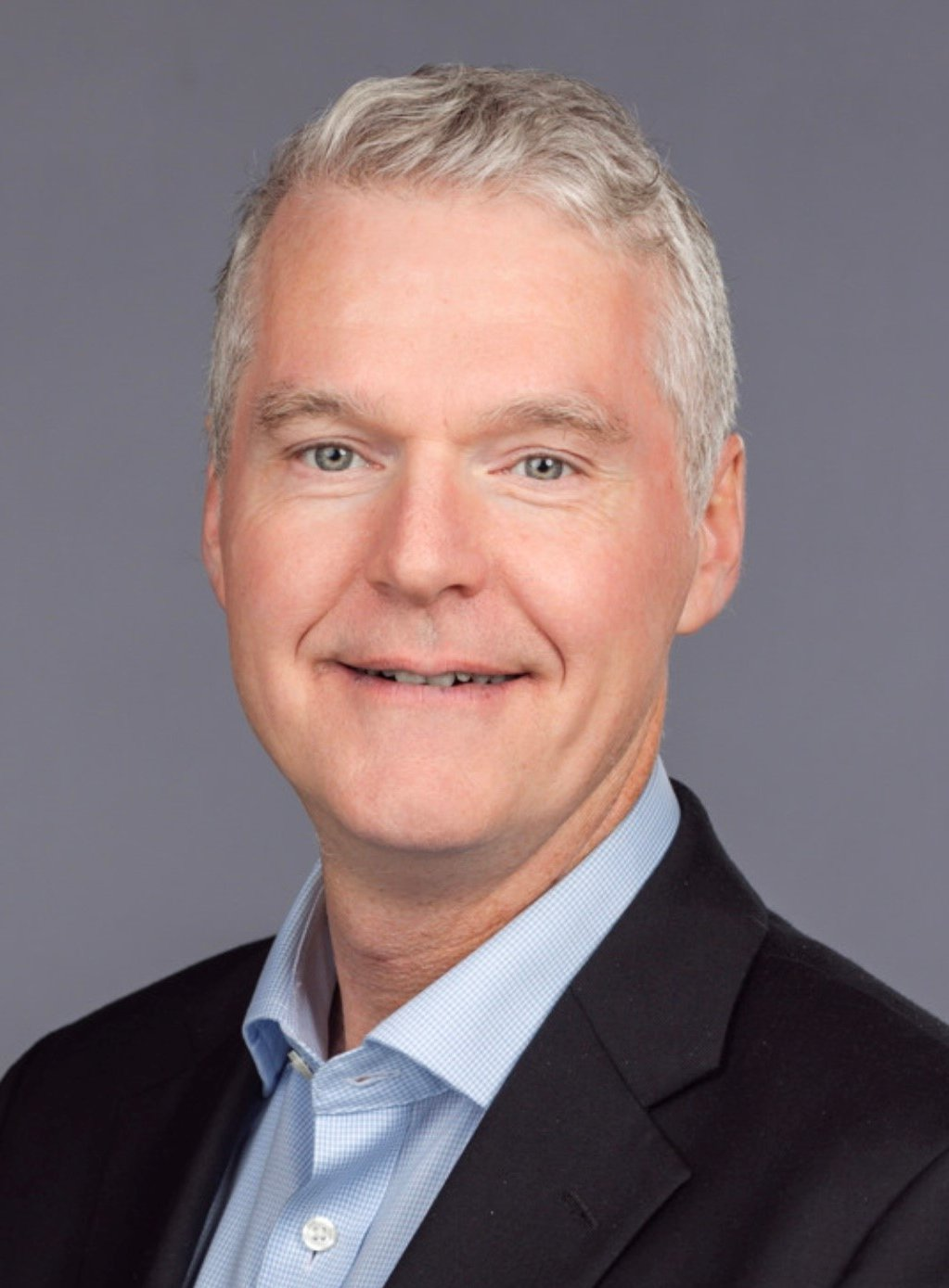
- Born: Brian William Pogue
- Education: York University (BSc, MSc); McMaster University (PhD); Harvard Medical School (Fellow)
- Known for: Cherenkov imaging in radiotherapy, biomedical optics, fluorescence guided surgery, photodynamic therapy, diffuse optical tomography
- Scientific career
- Fields: Biomedical engineering, medical physics
- Workplaces: Dartmouth College; University of Wisconsin School of Medicine and Public Health

Brian William Pogue is a Canadian-American biomedical engineer and medical physicist known for his research in optical imaging, photodynamic therapy, and biomedical optics. He is the Robert A. Pritzker Chair in Biomedical Engineering at the Thayer School of Engineering at Dartmouth College. He served as editor-in-chief of the Journal of Biomedical Optics from 2018 to 2024.

He was the lead inventor of Cherenkov radiation imaging in human cancer radiation therapy, developing the technique through basic and clinical studies with colleagues in the Department of Radiation Oncology and Applied Sciences at the Dartmouth–Hitchcock Medical Center. The work was developed into a commercial camera system that was cleared for human use by the US Food and Drug Administration, and today is widely used to visualize radiotherapy delivery on patients.

== Career ==
Pogue has held academic positions at Dartmouth College since 1996, where he began as research assistant professor, progressing to Associate Professor in 2004 and Professor in 2008. He served as Director of MS and PhD programs at the Thayer School of Engineering from 2006–08 and 2014–18, and as Dean of Graduate Studies at Dartmouth from 2008 to 2012. He was trained as a post doctoral fellow at the Wellman Center for Photomedicine in the Massachusetts General Hospital and Harvard Medical School, under the mentorship of Professor Tayyaba Hasan, working in photodynamic therapy mechanisms and dosimetry.

At Dartmouth, his career has focused on optical device engineering for therapeutic medical physics and oncologic surgery applications, extending from basic discovery and invention work to clinical translation and entrepreneurship. The development of Cherenkov imaging in radiation therapy was driven by basic research in his group, and into human studies at Dartmouth Health. Cherenkov imaging is now used in radiotherapy centers, allowing clinical teams to see the radiation beam as it is delivered to the patient via a video display of Cherenkov light on the patient's skin.

From 2022 to 2025, he served as chair of the Department of Medical Physics (University of Wisconsin–Madison) at the University of Wisconsin School of Medicine and Public Health, where he also held affiliated appointments in bioengineering and radiology. The Dept of Medical Physics at the University of Wisconsin-Madison houses the largest CAMPEP-accredited graduate program for training in diagnostic and therapeutic medical physics.

In 2025, he was appointed Robert A. Pritzker Chair in Biomedical Engineering at Dartmouth College. He also serves as Faculty Director of the Dartmouth Innovation Accelerator for Cancer in the Magnuson Center for Entrepreneurship. His current research focus is in the areas of advanced radiotherapy and surgical techniques, encompassing FLASH radiotherapy, Cherenkov luminescence imaging, Cherenkov light, photodynamic therapy, and fluorescence image-guided surgery.

Pogue has held adjunct and honorary academic appointments at several institutions, including the Geisel School of Medicine at Dartmouth and Xi'an Jiaotong University.

He served as Editor-in-Chief of the SPIE Society Publication Journal of Biomedical Optics from January 2018 to 2024. He was elected a Board Member of the SPIE society in 2025.

== Honors and awards ==
- Light Path Award, American Society for Photobiology (2012)
- Optica Fellow (2013)
- Elected Fellow, American Institute for Medical and Biological Engineering (2016)
- Endowed MacLean Professor in Engineering, Dartmouth College (2018)
- Elected Fellow, SPIE (2019)
- Distinguished Research Award for Faculty, Thayer School of Engineering at Dartmouth College (2021)
- Elected Fellow, National Academy of Inventors (2021)
- Elected Fellow, American Association of Physicists in Medicine (2023)
- Award for Significant Advances in Photodynamic Therapy, International Photodynamic Association (2023)
- University of Wisconsin-Madison SMPH Award for Outstanding Research (2024)
- Dartmouth Technology Innovation & Commercialization Award (2026)
