= Oxygen effect =

Phenomenon in biochemistry

In biochemistry, the oxygen effect refers to a tendency for increased radiosensitivity of free living cells and organisms in the presence of oxygen than in anoxic or hypoxic conditions, where the oxygen tension is less than 1% of atmospheric pressure (i.e., <1% of 101.3 kPa, 760 mmHg, or 760 torr).

== Physiology and causes ==
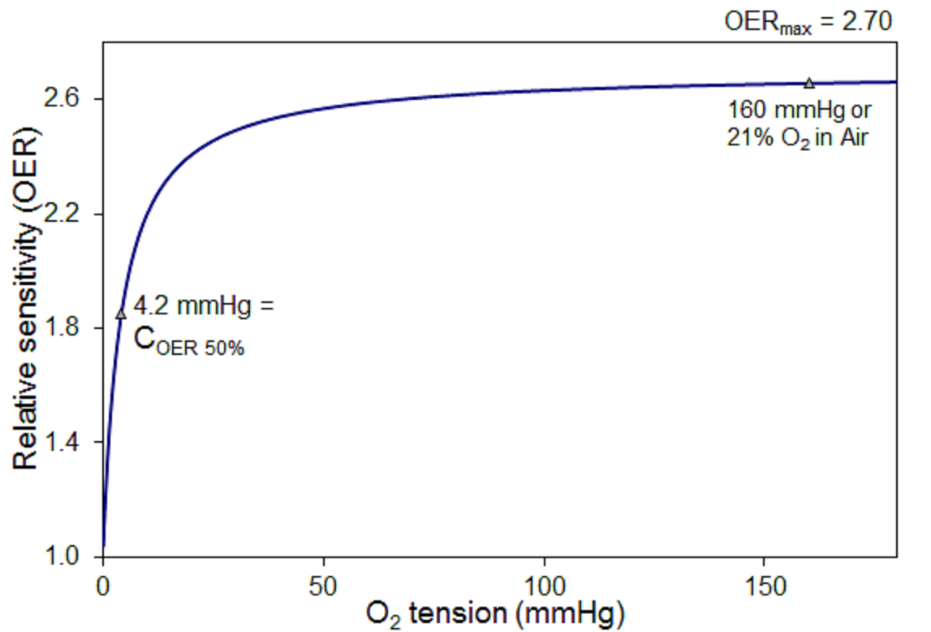
Relative sensitivity. This figure illustrates the typical change in the relative radiosensitivity for a biological effect such as cell death when exposed to radiations of low ionizing density (e.g. X-rays). The hyperbolic relationship shown has a maximum OER of 2.70 for 100% oxygen (at 760 mmHg), with a half-range OER value at 4.2 mmHg or 0.55% of oxygen.

=== Explanation of the oxygen effect and relevance to hypoxic tissues ===
The oxygen effect has particular importance in external beam radiation therapy, where the killing of tumor cells by photon and electron beams in well-oxygenated regions can be up to three times greater than in a poorly vasculated portion of the tumour.

Besides tumour hypoxia, the oxygen effect is also relevant to hypoxia conditions present in the normal physiology of stem cell niches such as the endosteum adjacent to bone in bone marrow and the epithelium layer of the intestine. In addition, there are non-malignant diseases where oxygenated tissues can become hypoxic such as in stenosed coronary arteries associated with cardiovascular disease.

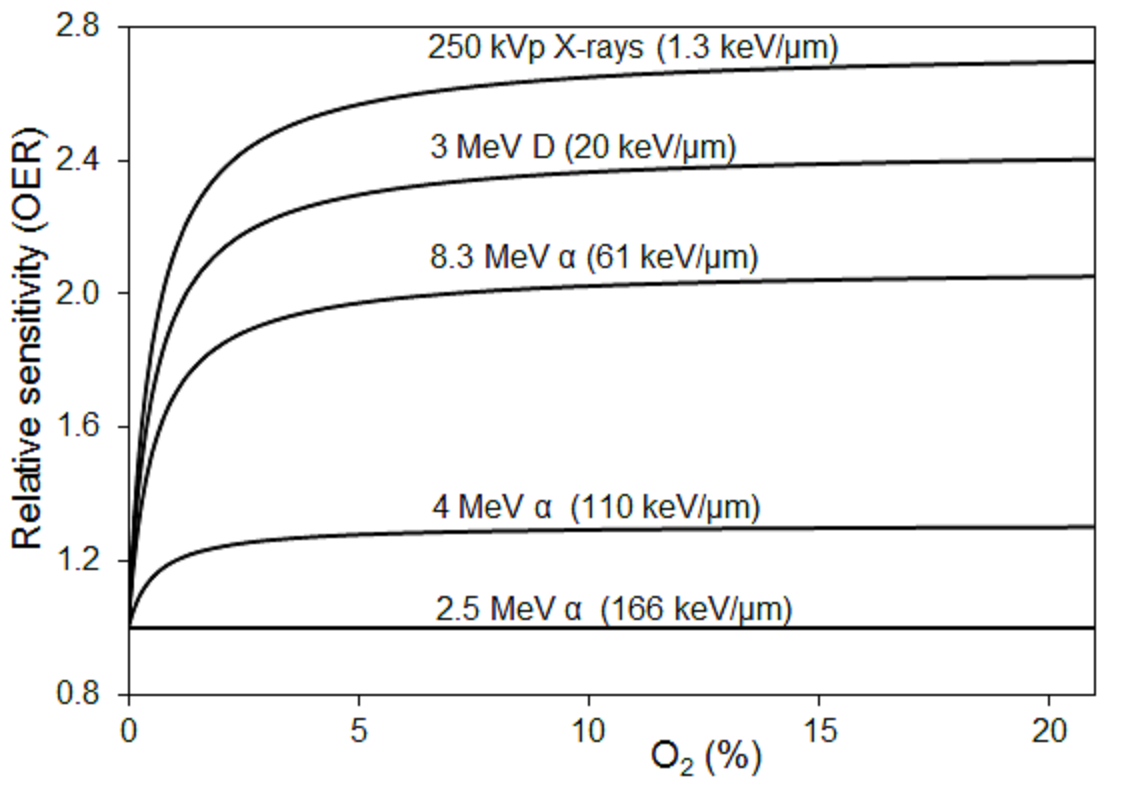
Change with ionizing density. This figure illustrates the trend in the relative radiosensitivity or OER with oxygen tension for radiations of different ionizing density or linear energy transfer (LET, keV/μm). The inhibition of clone-formation by cultured human cells was measured after exposure to alpha-particles, deuterons, and 250 kVp X-rays by Barendsen et al. (1966). The range of the maximum OER for 100% oxygen (at 760 mmHg) was 2.7 for 250 kVp X-rays dropping to 1.0 for 2.5 MeV alpha-particles. In each case the OER curves shown assume a half-range OER value of 4.2 mmHg or 0.55% oxygen.

=== Historical research on the oxygen effect ===
Holthusen (1921) first quantified the oxygen effect finding 2.5 to 3.0-fold less hatching eggs of the nematode Ascaris in oxygenated compared to anoxic conditions, which was incorrectly assigned to changes in cell division. However, two years later, Petry (1923) first attributed oxygen tension as affecting ionizing radiation effects on vegetable seeds. Later, the implications of the effects of oxygen on radiotherapy were discussed by Mottram (1936).

A key observation limiting hypotheses to explain the biological mechanisms of the oxygen effect is that the gas nitric oxide is a radiosensitizer with similar effects to oxygen observed in tumour cells. Another important observation is that oxygen must be present at irradiation or within milliseconds afterward for the oxygen effect to take place.

The best known explanation of the oxygen effect is the oxygen fixation hypothesis developed by Alexander in 1962, which posited that radiation-induced non-restorable or "fixed" nuclear DNA lesions are lethal to cells in the presence of diatomic oxygen. Recent hypotheses include one based on oxygen-enhanced damage from first principles. Another hypothesis posits that ionizing radiation provokes mitochondria to produce reactive oxygen (and nitrogen species), which are leakage during oxidative phosphorylation that varies with a hyperbolic saturation relationship observed with both the oxygen and nitric oxide effects.

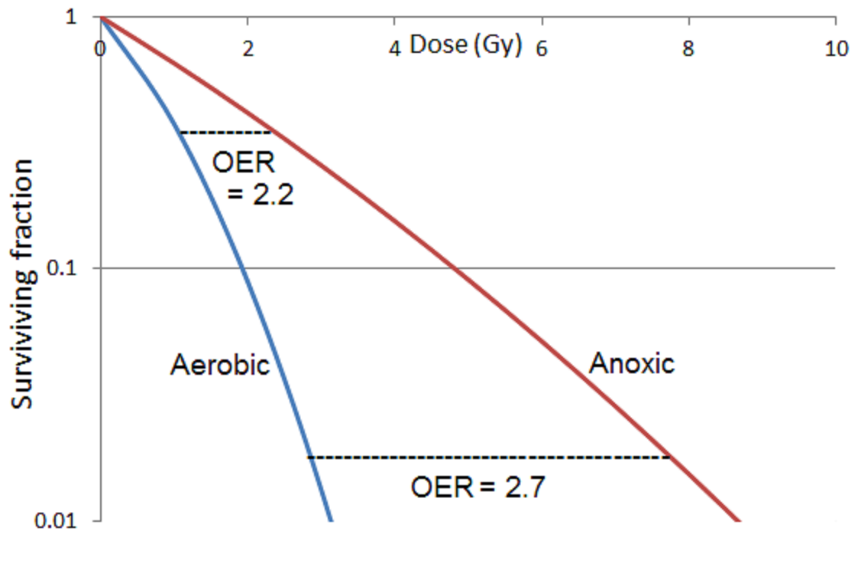
Cell survival. This figure is illustrative of the reduction in the OER from aerobic to anoxic conditions for lower compared to higher doses, which has a bearing on the choice of dose fractionation exposures for radiotherapy of tumours.

=== Oxygen enhancement ratio and the effect of radiation LET ===
The oxygen effect is quantified by measuring the radiation sensitivity or oxygen enhancement ratio (OER) of a particular biological effect (e.g., cell death or DNA damage), which is the ratio of doses under pure oxygen and anoxic conditions. Consequently, OER varies from unity in anoxia to a maximum value for 100% oxygen of typically up to three for low ionizing-density-radiation (beta-, gamma-, or X-rays), or so-called low linear energy transfer (LET) radiations.

Radiosensitivity varies most rapidly for oxygen partial pressures below ~1% atmospheric (Fig. 1). Howard-Flanders and Alper (1957) developed a formula for the hyperbolic function of OER and its variation with oxygen concentration, or oxygen pressure in air.

Radiobiologists identified additional characteristics of the oxygen effect that influence radiotherapy practices. They found that the maximum OER value diminishes as the ionizing-density of the radiation increases (Fig. 2), from low-LET to high-LET radiations. The OER is unity irrespective of the oxygen tension for alpha-particles of high-LET around 200 keV/μm. The OER is reduced for low doses as evaluated for cultured mammalian cells exposed to X-rays under aerobic (21% O2, 159 mmHg) and anoxic (nitrogen) conditions. Typical dose fractionation treatments are daily 2 Gy exposures, as below this dose the so-called 'shoulder' or repair region of the cell survival curve is encroached upon reducing the OER (Fig. 3).

== See also ==
- FLASH radiotherapy (the dose rate during treatment also affects the cell kill ratio)
