= SARC =

SARC may refer to:

== Health ==
- Sarcoma Alliance for Research through Collaboration, a nonprofit consortium of physicians in the US who conduct collaborative clinical trials
- Sexual assault referral centre, alternative name for type of a rape crisis centre, usually government-funded
  - Sexual Assault Referral Centers, founded as a response to rape during the Sierra Leone Civil War
  - St Mary's Sexual Assault Referral Centre, at Saint Mary's Hospital, Manchester, England
- Singapore Association for Retarded Children
- Special Amphibious Reconnaissance Corpsman, a type of medic of the United States Navy
- Syrian Arab Red Crescent

== Other uses ==
- Doctor Fernando Piragine Niveyro International Airport (ICAO: SARC), Argentina
- Sonic Arts Research Centre, a networked music performance research group at Queen's University Belfast, Northern Ireland
- Student Alumni Relations Cell, a student organisation of Indian Institute of Technology, Bombay, India
- Sudanese Awakening Revolutionary Council, a militant group in Sudan

== See also ==
- Proto-oncogene tyrosine-protein kinase Src, pronounced Sarc
- SAARC, South Asian Association for Regional Cooperation
