= Radiogenomics =

The term radiogenomics is used in two contexts: either to refer to the study of genetic variation associated with response to radiation (radiation genomics) or to refer to the correlation between cancer imaging features and gene expression (imaging genomics).

== Radiation genomics ==
In radiation genomics, radiogenomics is used to refer to the study of genetic variation associated with response to radiation therapy. Genetic variation, such as single nucleotide polymorphisms, is studied in relation to a cancer patient's risk of developing toxicity following radiation therapy. It is also used in the context of studying the genomics of tumor response to radiation therapy. One clinical application of radiogenomic principles is the genomic adjusted radiation dose (GARD), which uses tumor gene-expression signatures to estimate radiosensitivity.

The term radiogenomics was coined in 2002 by Andreassen et al. (2002) as an analogy to pharmacogenomics, which studies the genetic variation associated with drug responses. See also West et al. (2005) and Bentzen (2006).

== The Radiogenomics Consortium ==
In 2009, a Radiogenomics Consortium (RGC) was established to facilitate and promote multi-centre collaboration of researchers linking genetic variants with response to radiation therapy. The Radiogenomics Consortium is a Cancer Epidemiology Consortium supported by the Epidemiology and Genetics Research Program of the National Cancer Institute of the National Institutes of Health. RGC researchers have completed numerous clinical studies that identified genetic variants associated with radiation toxicities in patients with prostate, breast, lung, head and neck, and other cancers.

=== Past meetings ===
- 2009 - Manchester, UK. Consortium proposed.
- 2010 - New York, USA.
- 2011 - London, UK.
- 2012 - Boston, USA.
- 2013 - Cambridge (also REQUITE launch), UK.
- 2014 - Heidelberg, Germany.
- 2015 - Montpellier, France.
- 2016 - Maastricht, Netherlands.
- 2017 - Barcelona, Spain.
- 2018 - Manchester, UK.
- 2019 - Rochester, USA.
- 2020 - Online.
- 2021 - Online.
- 2022 - Groningen, Netherlands.
- 2023 - Manchester, UK.
- 2024 - Aarhus, Denmark.
- 2025 - Barcelona, Spain.

== Imaging genomics ==
Radiological images are used to diagnose disease on a large scale: tissue imaging correlates with tissue pathology. The addition of genomic data including DNA microarrays, miRNA, RNA-Seq allows new correlations to be made between cellular genomics and tissue-scale imaging.

== See also ==
- Pharmacogenomics
- Radiation therapy
- Radiosensitivity
