= Ruth A. Kleinerman =

American epidemiologist

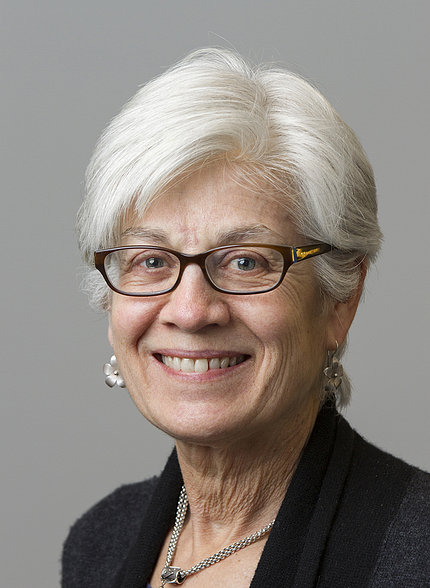
- Kleinerman in 2015
- Education: Boston University; City, University of London
- Children: 1
- Scientific career
- Fields: Epidemiology, cancer research
- Workplaces: National Cancer Institute

Ruth A. Kleinerman is an American epidemiologist specialized in retinoblastoma. Kleinerman worked at the National Cancer Institute (NCI) from 1979 to 2019 where she served as a staff scientist and deputy chief of the Radiation Epidemiology Branch.

== Education ==
Kleinerman earned a M.P.H. from Boston University. She completed a Ph.D. in public health at the City, University of London in 2016. Her dissertation was titled Second Cancers Following Treatment for Retinoblastoma. Her doctoral advisors were John Lawrenson and Caroline McGraw.

== Career ==
Kleinerman joined the National Cancer Institute (NCI) as an epidemiologist in 1979. She was a staff scientist and deputy chief in the NCI Radiation Epidemiology Branch (REB). Kleinerman retired in December 2019 from NCI’s Division of Cancer Epidemiology and Genetics (DCEG). After retirement she serves as a special volunteer to the division. Kleinerman was central to the administrative functioning of REB, serving as the project officer for research support contracts and interagency agreements.

=== Research ===
Kleinerman researched second cancers following treatment for retinoblastoma. Kleinerman collaborated with Memorial Sloan Kettering Cancer Center and the University of Massachusetts Medical School to follow a large cohort of adult survivors of retinoblastoma to describe radiosensitivity and risk of second cancers among patients with the hereditary form of the disease. This work influenced clinical practice to reduce the use of radiation to treat these children and was recognized with an NIH Merit Award and two NCI DCEG awards for outstanding research paper by a staff scientist. In addition to documenting her findings in the scientific literature, Kleinerman created newsletters and a website to communicate results to participants and families. She won two NIH Plain Language Awards for her clear and effective writing.

Kleinerman's early research included investigations on long-term effects of curative radiotherapy for cervical cancer, benign gynecological disease, and peptic ulcers. In addition to reporting dose-response relationships for over a dozen cancer sites, results from these studies demonstrated the potential to investigate second cancer risk from a range of radiation exposures. She also contributed to the first comprehensive mortality study in physicians conducting fluoroscopically guided interventional procedures, which reported an increased risk of leukemia in radiologists who graduated before 1940. She also helped launch a large international study on the risk of second cancers following proton therapy versus photon therapy in pediatric cancer patients.

Kleinerman collaborated on studies of environmental exposure to ionizing and nonionizing radiation. She was involved in the NCI-Children’s Oncology Group case-control study to address public health concerns about electromagnetic fields generated by power lines, a study that found no association between living near high-voltage power lines and risk of childhood acute lymphoblastic leukemia. She organized a large case-control study of radon and lung cancer in cave dwellers in China that included evaluation of other exposures such as cooking oil mutagenicity. Research on cooking fuels and indoor air pollution continues within the division and has been shown to be a significant risk factor for lung cancer among never-smoking women.

== Personal life ==
As of October 2016, Kleinerman is married to Steve Kleinrock. She has a daughter.
