= Hypoxia-activated prodrug =

Hypoxia-activated prodrugs are prodrugs that target regions of tumor hypoxia within tumor cells. These types of drugs have the potential, alone and in combination with conventional chemotherapy, of improving cancer therapy. Tumor hypoxia contributes significantly to treatment failure and relapse among cancer patients because cells in the hypoxic zones of solid tumors resist traditional chemotherapy. By targeting these cells with a specialized drug, more complete targeting of cancer cells can be achieved.

== Background ==
There are at least two reasons attributed to hypoxia's role in chemotherapy resistance: first, most antitumor agents cannot penetrate beyond 50-100 micrometers from capillaries, thereby never reaching those cells in the hypoxic regions. Secondly, the lower nutrient and oxygen supply to cells in the hypoxic zones of tumors cause them to divide more slowly than their well oxygenated counterparts, so hypoxic tumor cells exhibit greater resistance to chemotherapies and radiation which target rapidly dividing cells or require oxygen for efficacy.

Hypoxia also contributes to the invasive and metastatic phenotypes of aggressive cancers by promoting genetic instability and accelerating the accumulation of mutations that can ultimately give rise to drug resistance.

== Mechanism ==
Chemically speaking, most hypoxia-activated prodrugs are activated by a reduction reaction, which is only likely to happen in hypoxic cells. A number of enzymes and other biochemicals can provide this reducing force such as CYP450 and DT-diaphorase. Some examples are:

- Tirapazamine, which undergoes 1-electron reduction by CYP to produce an oxidative radical.
- AQ4N, a dione that undergoes 2-electron reduction by CYP to produce a DNA-binding chemical.
- PR-104, a nitrogen mustard activated by reduction.
- EO9 (apaziquone), activated by DT-diaphorase reduction.
- TH-302 (evofosfamide), a prodrug of bromo-isophosphoramide mustard activated by reduction.
- SN30000 (CEN-209), an analogue of tirapazamine, also activated by 1-electron reduction to form a radical.

== Companies working on hypoxia-activated prodrugs ==
Several companies worked on developing hypoxia-activated prodrugs.

Defunct or not actively working on HAPs anymore:

- Novacea, Inc. (acquired by Transcept/Paratek pharmaceuticals),
- Proacta Inc. (now defunct)
- Threshold Pharmaceuticals, Inc (merged with Molecular Templates, which was delisted end 2024)

Actively working on it:

- Convert Pharmaceuticals

These companies were/are involved in developing the following drug candidates: AQ4N (Novacea), PR-104 (Proacta) and TH-302 (evofosfamide), CP506 and TH-4000/tarloxotinib (Convert Pharmaceuticals).
