= Evofosfamide =

Clinical data
- Other names: TH-302; HAP-302

Identifiers
- IUPAC name: 2-Bromo-N-[(2-bromoethylamino)-[(3-methyl-2-nitroimidazol-4-yl)methoxy]phosphoryl]ethanamine
- CAS Number: 918633-87-1
- PubChem CID: 11984561
- DrugBank: DB06091
- ChemSpider: 10157061
- UNII: 8A9RZ3HN8W
- KEGG: D10704
- ChEBI: CHEBI:231678
- ChEMBL: ChEMBL260046
- CompTox Dashboard (EPA): DTXSID60238721

Chemical and physical data
- Formula: C_{9}H_{16}Br_{2}N_{5}O_{4}P
- Molar mass: 449.040 g·mol^{−1}
- 3D model (JSmol): Interactive image
- SMILES: CN1C(=CN=C1[N+](=O)[O-])COP(=O)(NCCBr)NCCBr
- InChI: InChI=InChI=1S/C9H16Br2N5O4P/c1-15-8(6-12-9(15)16(17)18)7-20-21(19,13-4-2-10)14-5-3-11/h6H,2-5,7H2,1H3,(H2,13,14,19); Key:UGJWRPJDTDGERK-UHFFFAOYSA-N

Evofosfamide (development code TH-302) is an investigational new drug that is being evaluated for the treatment of multiple tumor types, including pancreatic cancer, soft tissue sarcoma, and multiple myeloma, often in combination with other therapies. It is a hypoxia-activated prodrug designed to target and kill hypoxic cells within tumors. It functions by releasing the DNA crosslinking agent bromo-isophosphoramide mustard under low oxygen conditions, making it potentially effective against tumor regions where standard chemotherapy and radiation therapies are less effective due to hypoxia.

Commercialization has not been pursued due to the failure of several clinical trials.

== Pharmacology ==
Evofosfamide is a 2-nitroimidazole prodrug of the cytotoxin bromo-isophosphoramide mustard (Br-IPM). Evofosfamide is activated by a process that involves a 1-electron (1 e^{−}) reduction mediated by ubiquitous cellular reductases, such as the NADPH cytochrome P450, to generate a radical anion prodrug:

A) In the presence of oxygen (normoxia) the radical anion prodrug reacts rapidly with oxygen to generate the original prodrug and superoxide. Therefore, evofosfamide is relatively inert under normal oxygen conditions, remaining intact as a prodrug.
B) When exposed to severe hypoxic conditions (< 0.5% O_{2}; hypoxic zones in many tumors), however, the radical anion undergoes irreversible fragmentation, releasing the active drug Br-IPM and an azole derivative. The released cytotoxin Br-IPM alkylates DNA, inducing intrastrand and interstrand crosslinks.

Evofosfamide is largely inactive under normal oxygen levels. In areas of hypoxia, evofosfamide becomes activated and converts to an alkylating cytotoxic agent resulting in DNA cross-linking. This renders cells unable to replicable their DNA and divide, leading to apoptosis. This investigational therapeutic approach of targeting the cytotoxin to hypoxic zones in tumors may cause less broad systemic toxicity that is seen with untargeted cytotoxic chemotherapies.

The activation of evofosfamide to the active drug Br-IPM and the mechanism of action (MOA) via cross-linking of DNA is shown schematically below:

== Drug development history ==
Phosphorodiamidate-based, DNA-crosslinking, bis-alkylator mustards have long been used successfully in cancer chemotherapy and include e.g. the prodrugs ifosfamide and cyclophosphamide. To demonstrate that known drugs of proven efficacy could serve as the basis of efficacious hypoxia-activated prodrugs, the 2-nitroimidizole HAP of the active phosphoramidate bis-alkylator derived from ifosfamide was synthesized. The resulting compound, TH-281, had a high HCR (hypoxia cytotoxicity ratio), a quantitative assessment of its hypoxia selectivity. Subsequent structure-activity relationship (SAR) studies showed that replacement of the chlorines in the alkylator portion of the prodrug with bromines improved potency about 10-fold. The resulting, final compound is evofosfamide, which was developed by Threshold Pharmaceuticals. Threshold Pharmaceuticals Inc. applied for a patent on evofosfamide in 2006 which was granted in 2011.

In 2012, Threshold signed a global license and co-development agreement for evofosfamide with Merck KGaA. Threshold was responsible for the development of evofosfamide in the soft tissue sarcoma indication in the United States. In all other cancer indications, Threshold and Merck KGaA developed evofosfamide together. After evofosfamide failed to improve longevity in patients in phase three clinical trials, Merck abandoned attempts to commercialize evofosfamide in 2015.

== Synthesis ==
Evofosfamide can be synthesized in seven steps.

== Clinical trials ==
=== Overview and results ===
Evofosfamide was evaluated in clinical studies as a monotherapy and in combination with chemotherapy agents and other targeted cancer drugs. The indications were a broad spectrum of solid tumor types and blood cancers.

Evofosfamide clinical trials (as of 16 March 2025):

Clinical Trials of Evofosfamide
NCT ID	Title	Phase	Study Status
Clinical trial number NCT0074337 at ClinicalTrials.gov	Dose-Escalation Study of TH-302	PHASE1	COMPLETED
Clinical trial number NCT0114445 at ClinicalTrials.gov	Study of the Safety and Efficacy of TH-302	PHASE2	COMPLETED
Clinical trial number NCT0114991 at ClinicalTrials.gov	Study of Hypoxia-Activated Prodrug TH-302 to Treat Advanced Leukemias	PHASE1	COMPLETED
Clinical trial number NCT0138182 at ClinicalTrials.gov	Dose-Escalation Study of TH-302 in Combination With Sunitinib	PHASE1	UNKNOWN
Clinical trial number NCT0140361 at ClinicalTrials.gov	Safety and Efficacy Study of TH-302 CNS Penetration in Recurrent High Grade Astrocytoma	PHASE2	COMPLETED
Clinical trial number NCT0144008 at ClinicalTrials.gov	A Trial of TH-302 in Combination With Doxorubicin	PHASE2	COMPLETED
Clinical trial number NCT0148504 at ClinicalTrials.gov	Dose Escalation Study of Pazopanib Plus TH-302	PHASE1	COMPLETED
Clinical trial number NCT0149744 at ClinicalTrials.gov	Sorafenib Tosylate and Hypoxia-Activated Prodrug TH-302 in Treating Advanced Kidney or Liver Cancer	PHASE1	COMPLETED
Clinical trial number NCT0152287 at ClinicalTrials.gov	Open-label Study of TH-302 and Dexamethasone	PHASE1	UNKNOWN
Clinical trial number NCT0172194 at ClinicalTrials.gov	TH-302 Plus Doxorubicin Delivered by Trans-Arterial Chemoembolization (TACE)	PHASE1	UNKNOWN
Clinical trial number NCT0174697 at ClinicalTrials.gov	Clinical Trial Testing TH-302 in Combination With Gemcitabine	PHASE3	COMPLETED
Clinical trial number NCT0183354 at ClinicalTrials.gov	A Japanese Phase 1 Trial of TH-302	PHASE1	COMPLETED
Clinical trial number NCT0186459 at ClinicalTrials.gov	A Phase 2 Biomarker-Enriched Study of TH-302 in Advanced Melanoma	PHASE2	TERMINATED
Clinical trial number NCT0202022 at ClinicalTrials.gov	A Cardiac Safety Study of TH-302	PHASE1	UNKNOWN
Clinical trial number NCT0204750 at ClinicalTrials.gov	Phase I TH-302 Plus Gemcitabine Plus Nab-Paclitaxel	PHASE1	TERMINATED
Clinical trial number NCT0207629 at ClinicalTrials.gov	A Phase 1 TH-302 Mass Balance Trial	PHASE1	COMPLETED
Clinical trial number NCT0209396 at ClinicalTrials.gov	Study of TH-302 or Placebo in Combination With Pemetrexed	PHASE2	TERMINATED
Clinical trial number NCT0225511 at ClinicalTrials.gov	A Japanese Trial of TH-302 in Soft Tissue Sarcoma	PHASE2	TERMINATED
Clinical trial number NCT0234237 at ClinicalTrials.gov	TH-302 in Combination With Bevacizumab for Glioblastoma	PHASE2	COMPLETED
Clinical trial number NCT0240206 at ClinicalTrials.gov	A Study to Assess the Safety and Efficacy of TH-302 and Sunitinib in Neuroendocrine Pancreatic Tumours	PHASE1	COMPLETED
Clinical trial number NCT0243369 at ClinicalTrials.gov	Study of TH-302 Monotherapy as Second-line Treatment in Biliary Tract Cancer	PHASE2	COMPLETED
Clinical trial number NCT0249689 at ClinicalTrials.gov	A Study of Hypoxia Imaging in Pancreatic Cancer Patients Being Treated With Gemcitabine and TH-302	NA	WITHDRAWN
Clinical trial number NCT0259868 at ClinicalTrials.gov	Testing TH-302, in Combination With Preoperative Chemoradiotherapy, in Esophageal Cancer	PHASE1	WITHDRAWN
Clinical trial number NCT0271256 at ClinicalTrials.gov	SARC021C: A Continuation Study of TH-CR-406/SARC021	NA	NO_LONGER_AVAILABLE
Clinical trial number NCT0309816 at ClinicalTrials.gov	Immunotherapy Study of Evofosfamide in Combination With Ipilimumab	PHASE1	UNKNOWN
Clinical trial number NCT0678255 at ClinicalTrials.gov	A Study of Evofosfamide in Combination with Zalifrelimab and Balstilimab	PHASE1	RECRUITING
Clinical trial number NCT0683672 at ClinicalTrials.gov	Clinical Trial to Test Efficacy of Targeting Hypoxia Combined With ARSI After First-line ARSI Therapy for Castrate Resistant Prostate Cancer	PHASE2	NOT_YET_RECR

=== Soft tissue sarcoma ===
Evofosfamide was tested in combination with doxorubicin in patients with advanced soft tissue sarcoma. The study TH-CR-403 was a single arm trial investigating evofosfamide in combination with doxorubicin. Evofosfamide was further tested in the Phase 3 clinical trial TH-CR-406/SARC021 with results published in 2017 indicating no improvement in patient mortality rates.

=== Metastatic pancreatic cancer ===
Evofosfamide was studied in combination with gemcitabine in patients with metastatic pancreatic cancer. The study TH-CR-404 compared gemcitabine with gemcitabine plus evofosfamide. The study showed comparable efficacy profiles for evofosfamide and nab-paclitaxel when combined with gemcitabine; however, the hematologic toxicity was higher for patients given evofosfamide vs. nab-paclitaxel.

In the Phase 3 MAESTRO study, patients with previously untreated, locally advanced unresectable or metastatic pancreatic adenocarcinoma treated with evofosfamide in combination with gemcitabine did not demonstrate a statistically significant improvement in overall survival.

=== Nasopharyngeal carcinoma ===
Oxygen deficient conditions are linked to tumor progression throughout the body and poses an issue in cancer treatments such as chemotherapy and radiation. Hypoxia-activated prodrugs (HAPs) function in hypoxic conditions and inhibit the growth of tumor cells. Evofosfamide is a HAP that targets tumor progression in nasopharyngeal carcinoma (NPC) tissues by inhibiting the overexpression of hypoxia-inducible factor-1α (HIF-1α).

In this study, the efficacy of Evofosfamide along with cisplastin (DDP) in blocking cell progression was measured. "The combination of evofosfamide with DDP had a synergistic effect on cytotoxicity in the NPC cell lines by combination index values assessment. Cell cycle G2 phase was arrested after treated with 0.05 μmol/L evofosfamide under hypoxia. Histone H2AX phosphorylation (γH2AX) (a marker of DNA damage) expression increased while HIF-1α expression suppressed after evofosfamide treatment under hypoxic conditions". These findings allow for evidence for Evofosfamide to be pushed towards clinical trials to further investigate the potential to be developed as an FDA approved anticancer drug.

== See also ==
- Hypoxia-activated prodrugs
- Hypoxia
- PR-104
