= FLASH radiotherapy =

Form of radiotherapy

FLASH radiotherapy is an emerging form of radiation therapy which delivers a high dose of radiation to the patient in an ultra-short time frame. It produces a tumour-killing effect comparable to conventional radiotherapy but with less damage to surrounding healthy tissue. The treatment is in the early stages of development and is not yet widely available as a form of cancer therapy.

== History ==
Research into high-dose radiotherapy yielding cells which were more resistant to radiation was first performed in the 1950s but, without any breakthrough achievements, research dwindled after the 1960s.

However, in 2014 a research paper published by V. Favaudon et al. coined the term FLASH, which they defined as irradiating tissue with a dose rate ≥ 40 Gy/s. The research compared conventional radiotherapy (CONV-RT) to FLASH radiotherapy in mice, using a linear electron accelerator (LINAC) that generated 4.5 MeV electrons with a high beam current, such that a high dose could be administered by a single beam in less than 500ms. This research showed that the onset and progression of pneumonia and pulmonary fibrosis were measurably inhibited following a solitary exposure to 17 Gy FLASH-RT, when compared to CONV-RT, yet the effect on a tumour was comparable.

More recently, in 2019 first human FLASH-RT treatment was performed at Lausanne University Hospital, which concluded that FLASH-RT was both feasible and safe. Subsequently, in 2023 the first proton clinical trial of FLASH-RT was performed at the joint Cincinnati Children's Hospital Medical Center UC Health Proton Therapy Center. The trial focused on bone metastases of 10 patients with an age range of 27–81 years old, and a 50/50 split in sex, it concluded that FLASH-RT was clinically feasible and that the findings supported further exploration into FLASH-RT. The results were first presented at the 2022 American Society for Radiation Oncology Annual Meeting.

== Mechanism ==
Parameter	FLASH-RT	CONV-RT
Mean dose rate	≥ 40 Gy/s (minimum threshold)	≤ 1 Gy/s
Delivery time	< 200 ms	> 1 min
Dose delivery	High dose in a single fraction	Low dose in a single fraction
Tumor control	A similar antitumor effect as CONV-RT	Effective tumor killing
Normal tissue sparing	Damage to healthy tissues reduced	Acute and late damage to healthy tissues
Defects	Early stages of development/few facilities	Radiation injury, limited treatment window

The increased radiosensitivity of cells in an oxygenated environment compared to a hypoxic one is known as the oxygen effect, this is the basis of one of the first and most widely investigated hypotheses which could explain the FLASH effect. Many research papers have been published investigating whether FLASH RT creates a hypoxic environment in healthy tissue, which makes it less radiosensitive. The oxygen depletion was thought to be caused by radiolysis of water molecules, where water breaks down into hydrogen peroxide, hydrogen radicals, and reactive oxygen species. However, experimental studies demonstrated that oxygen depletion does not occur. A new hypothesis suggests that, at FLASH dose rates, radical–radical interactions compete with radical–oxygen reactions, thereby reducing the oxygen sensitization effect during radiation. Numerous open questions remain in the understanding of the FLASH effect, particularly regarding its underlying biological and chemical mechanisms.

Since blood is constantly flowing around the human body, during CONV-RT a large volume of this blood is expected to be irradiated. A possible reason for FLASH-RT sparing normal tissues is that a lower total blood volume is irradiated when compared with CONV-RT. Blood carries more than just oxygen throughout the body, it contains immune cells which help to fight infection and disease. Multiple studies have investigated this possibility, one being Jin. et al., 2020, where it was observed that circulating blood cells experienced a significantly lower impact during FLASH-RT, resulting in the killing of only 5-10% of cells, in contrast, CONV-RT exhibited a much more substantial effect, leading to the death of 90-100% of cells. Aside from immune cells, studies have shown that the proinflammatory signalling in the form of the secretion of proinflammatory cytokines is reduced during FLASH-RT when compared to CONV-RT.

== Preclinical research ==
Animal models have played a central role in establishing the FLASH effect since the foundational 2014 study by Favaudon et al., which demonstrated normal tissue sparing in mice using electron beams. Preclinical studies continue to be essential for understanding the biological mechanisms of FLASH-RT and for developing the specialized irradiation platforms needed before clinical translation can occur.

The majority of early preclinical FLASH research used electron beams, as these are the most technically accessible way to achieve ultra-high dose rates. Whole-brain FLASH irradiation in mice was found to spare memory function that was lost with conventional dose-rate irradiation at the same dose. The FLASH effect was subsequently confirmed in larger animals, with normal tissue sparing demonstrated in mini-pigs and a durable complete response with reduced toxicity observed in a cat treated for cancer, providing early evidence that the effect was not limited to mouse models.

Proton beams have also been investigated as a FLASH delivery modality, offering the additional advantage of the Bragg peak for precise dose deposition. A validated proton FLASH irradiation system demonstrated that FLASH proton radiotherapy reduced gastrointestinal damage in mice compared to standard proton radiotherapy while maintaining equivalent tumor control. Pencil beam scanning proton FLASH has also been shown to maintain tumor control while reducing normal tissue damage in a mouse model, a result relevant to clinical delivery techniques.

Because most early FLASH research relied on electron accelerators or proton beamlines that are large, expensive, and limited to specialist facilities, efforts have been made to develop more accessible photon-based platforms for standard laboratory settings. The feasibility of a self-shielded kV x-ray cabinet system capable of delivering FLASH dose rates using rotating-anode x-ray sources in a parallel-opposed arrangement has been demonstrated, enabling FLASH and conventional dose-rate irradiation within the same compact platform. Building on this work, the FLASH-SARRP, a small animal irradiation platform developed at Johns Hopkins University and commercialized by Xstrahl, was reported to support dose rates ranging from under 1 Gy/s up to 100 Gy/s, supporting comparative studies between FLASH and conventional irradiation in murine models.

== See also ==
- Reciprocity failure
