= Tumor hypoxia =

Situation where tumor cells have been deprived of oxygen

Tumor stroma and extracellular matrix in hypoxia

Tumor hypoxia is the situation where tumor cells have been deprived of oxygen. As a tumor grows, it rapidly outgrows its blood supply, leaving portions of the tumor with regions where the oxygen concentration is significantly lower than in healthy tissues. Hypoxic microenvironments in solid tumors are a result of available oxygen being consumed within 70 to 150 μm of tumor vasculature by rapidly proliferating tumor cells thus limiting the amount of oxygen available to diffuse further into the tumor tissue. In order to support continuous growth and proliferation in challenging hypoxic environments, cancer cells are found to alter their metabolism. Furthermore, hypoxia is known to change cell behavior and is associated with extracellular matrix remodeling and increased migratory and metastatic behavior.

== Changes in the glycolytic pathway ==
A particular change in metabolism, historically known as the Warburg effect results in high rates of glycolysis in both normoxic and hypoxic cancer cells. Expression of genes responsible for glycolytic enzymes and glucose transporters are enhanced by numerous oncogenes including RAS, SRC, and MYC.

=== HIF-1 induced changes in gene expression ===
HIF regulates interactions of cancer cells with ECM and ECM biosynthesis

During cancer progression, tumor cells acquire comprehensive metabolic reprogramming, and tissue hypoxia is a prominent feature of solid tumors leading to cell metabolism adaptive changes. Hypoxia inducible factor-1α (HIF-1α) is a key oxygen-regulated transcriptional activator, playing a fundamental role in the adaptation of tumor cells to hypoxia by upregulating the transcription of target genes related to multiple biological processes, including cell survival, proliferation, angiogenesis and anti-apoptosis. Significant HIF1A expression has been noted in most solid tumors studied, which include cancers of the gastric and colon.

Genes, whose transcription is affected by HIF-1α include: solute carrier family 2 (GLUT1), hexokinase (HK), phosphoglucose isomerase (PGI), phosphofructokinase (PFKL), fructose-bisphosphate aldolase (ALDO), glyceraldehyde-3-phosphate dehydrogenase (GAPDH), phosphoglycerate kinase (PGK), phosphoglycerate mutase (PGM), enolase 1 (ENOA), pyruvate kinase (PK), pyruvate dehydrogenase kinase, isozyme 1 (PDK1) and lactate dehydrogenase A (LDH-A).

In addition to alterations in oxygen concentration associated with hypoxic microenvironments, glucose concentration gradients found in tumors also influence the rate of aerobic and anaerobic glycolysis. A carbohydrate-response element (ChoRE) is responsible for regulating glycolytic enzyme gene expression in response to changing glucose concentrations through a binding interaction at the same consensus sequence as HIF-1. Interactions of HIF-1 and ChoRE with the DNA sequence 5’-RCGTG-3’ leads to increased expression of genes listed above.

=== GLUT1 transporter expression ===
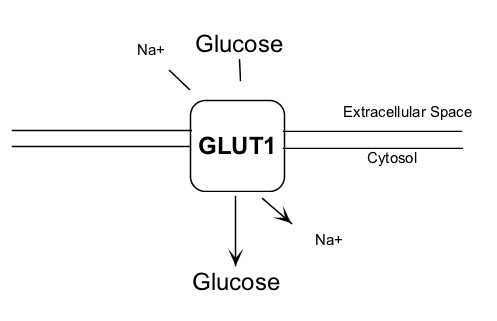
GLUT1 Glucose Transporter

GLUT1 is a member of the GLUT transporter family of 14 hexose transporters responsible for facilitating the transport of hexose sugars along the concentration gradient. GLUT1 is the most abundantly expressed of the family thought to maintain basal glucose transport in almost all cell types. GLUT1 levels, in response to hypoxic conditions, have been shown to increase with changes at both the mRNA and protein levels. Moreover, transport of GLUT1 has been shown to increase under these hypoxic conditions. With the role of transporting sugars from the extracellular to the intracellular environment, GLUT1, along with other members of the GLUT family, can be rate-controlling for cellular glycolytic metabolism. Having an increased level of GLUT1, in the case of hypoxic tumors, increases the flux of glucose into the cells allowing for a higher rate of glycolysis and thus greater risks of metastasis (as elaborated upon below).

=== Hexokinase 2 expression ===
Hexokinase (HK) is the first enzyme in the glycolytic pathway converting glucose to glucose-6-phosphate through an ATP-dependent phosphorylation event. Important for glycolysis to proceed, the hexokinase reaction activates glucose for subsequent steps. In hypoxic tumors, hexokinase mRNA abundance is significantly increased as well as protein levels. Increased expression of hexokinase 2, in some cases nearly 10-fold, allows for an increased flux of glucose through the glycolytic pathway subsequent to the increased uptake by GLUT1.

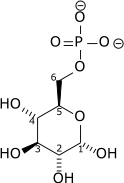
D-Glucose	Hexokinase Expression up-regulated by HIF-1		α-D-Glucose 6-phosphate
	ATP	ADP
	PO^{3-}_{4}	H_{2}O
	Glucose 6-phosphatase

=== Phosphoglucose isomerase expression ===
Phosphoglucose isomerase (PGI) is a housekeeping cytosolic enzyme with roles in both glycolysis and gluconeogenesis pathways. It is responsible for catalyzing the interconversion of glucose 6-phosphate and fructose 6-phosphate. Extracellularly, PGI is known as an autocrine motility factor (AMF) eliciting mitogenic, motogenic, differentiation functions as well as tumor progression and metastasis. Activation of PGI through proposed HIF-1 induced mechanisms results in increased conversion of glucose 6-phosphate to fructose 6-phosphate and also contributes to cell motility and invasion during cancer metastasis.

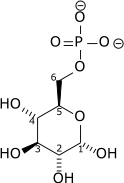
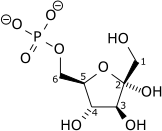
α-D-Glucose 6-phosphate	Phosphoglucose isomerase Expression up-regulated by HIF-1	β-D-Fructose 6-phosphate
	Phosphoglucose isomerase

=== 6-Phosphofructo-2-kinase/fructose 2,6-bisphosphatases expression ===
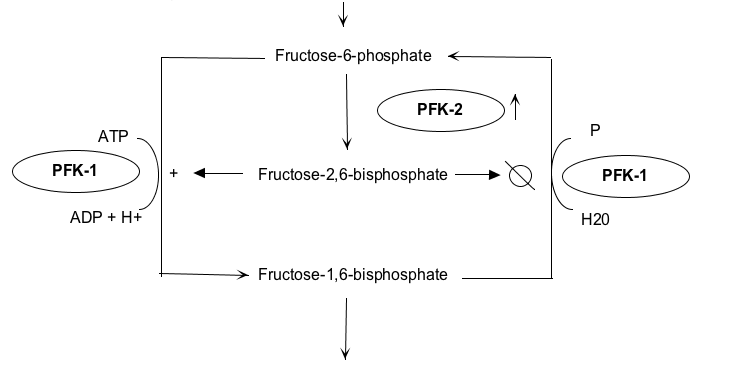
Regulatory pathway of PFK-1 by fructose-2,6-bisphosphate

6-Phosphofructo-2-kinases/fructose 2,6-bisphosphatases (PFKFBs) belong to a family of bifunctional ATP-dependent enzymes responsible for controlling the level of glycolysis intermediate fructose-1,6-bisphosphate. HIF-1-induced expression of these enzymes (PFK-2/FBPase-2) subsequently alters the balance of fructose-2,6-bisphosphate which plays an important role as an allosteric activator of phospho-fructokinase 1 (PFK-1). PFK-1 is an enzyme that controls one of the most critical steps of glycolysis. Regulation of PFK-1 is also mediated by the cellular energy status in result of ATP's inhibitory effect. Greater quantities of fructose-2,6-bisphosphate in cancer cells, in result of HIF-1 expression of PFK-2/FBPase-2, thus activates PFK-1allowing for an increased glycolytic flux converting fructose-6-phosphate to fructose-1,6-bisphosphate. Allosteric regulation of glycolysis by fructose-2,6-bisphosphate allows cancer cells to maintain a glycolytic balance to match their bioenergetic and biosynthetic demands.

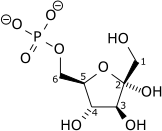
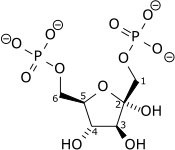
β-D-Fructose 6-phosphate (F6P)	phosphofructokinase (PFK-1); Expression up-regulated by HIF-1		β-D-Fructose 1,6-bisphosphate (F1,6BP)
	ATP	H^{+} + ADP

=== Fructose-1,6-bisphosphate aldolase expression ===
Fructose-1,6-bisphosphate aldolase (ALDO) belongs to a family include aldolase A, B and C. Unique in glycolysis, aldolase enzymes cleave fructose-1,6-bisphosphate into two 3-C molecules including glyceraldehyde-3-phosphate (GAP) and dihydroxyacetone phosphate (DHAP). With the HIF-1 mediated expression of aldolase A under hypoxic conditions, the catalysis of fructose-2,6-bisphosphate to glyceraldehyde-3-phosphate and dihydroxyacetone phosphate is increased thus leading to increased glycolytic flux.

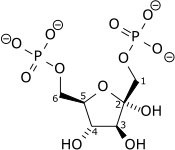
β-D-Fructose 1,6-bisphosphate (F1,6BP)	fructose-1,6-bisphosphate aldolase Expression up-regulated by HIF-1	D-glyceraldehyde 3-phosphate (GADP)		Dihydroxyacetone phosphate (DHAP)
			+

=== Glyceraldehyde-3-phosphate dehydrogenase expression ===
The glycolytic enzyme, glyceraldehyde-3-phosphate dehydrogenase (GAPDH), is responsible for the oxidative conversion of glyceraldehyde-3-phosphate (GADP) to 1,3-bisphosphoglycerate (1,3BPG). Up-regulation of glyceraldehyde-3-phosphate dehydrogenase expression is maximal (4-5 fold) following hypoxic conditions of ~24 hours in vascular endothelial cells. Various models for the exact glyceraldehyde-3-phosphate dehydrogenase activation mechanisms have been proposed.

glyceraldehyde 3-phosphate (GADP)	glyceraldehyde phosphate dehydrogenase Expression up-regulated by HIF-1		D-1,3-bisphosphoglycerate (1,3BPG)
	NAD^{+} + P_{i}	NADH + H^{+}

=== Phosphoglycerate kinase 1 expression ===
Hypoxia has been shown to induce a 10-fold accumulation of phosphoglycerate kinase 1 (PGK-1) mRNA in mouse hepatoma (Hepa 1c1c7) cells. Phosphoglycerate kinase 1 is an enzyme involved in the conversion of 1,3-bisphosphoglycerate (1,3-BPG) to 3-phosphoglycerate (3-P-G) leading the production of ATP from ADP. Induction of gene expression by HIF-1 is thought to be dependent on the presence of aromatic hydrocarbon receptor nuclear translocator (ARNT1). Arnt's N-terminal region and HIF-1 are thought to work together to induce transcription of phosphoglycerate kinase 1.

1,3-bisphosphoglycerate (1,3-BPG)	phosphoglycerate kinase Expression up-regulated by HIF-1		3-phosphoglycerate (3-P-G)
	ADP	ATP
	phosphoglycerate kinase

=== Phosphoglycerate mutase expression ===
Phosphoglycerate mutase B (PGM-B) is one of the latter glycolytic enzymes responsible for the conversion of 3-phosphoglycerate (3PG) to 2-phosphoglycerate (2PG). Both protein and mRNA levels were shown to increase 2-3-fold in research exposing fetal rat lung fibroblasts to hypoxic conditions. Increased levels appeared to be regulated at the transcriptional level as per many of the other glycolytic enzymes. Maximum up regulation was shown following 16 hours thus supporting its role in contributing to an increased glycolytic flux for adaption of cells to hypoxia.

3-phosphoglycerate (3PG)	phosphoglycerate mutase Expression up-regulated by HIF-1	2-phosphoglycerate (2PG)

=== Enolase 1 expression ===
Enolase 1, also known as α-enolase, is encoded by the ENOA gene and is responsible for converting 2-phosphoglycerate to phosphoenolpyruvate in the glycolytic pathway. Both enolase 1 overexpression and its post-translational modifications could be of value for diagnostic and prognostic work in terms of cancer. Although the exact roles of post-translational modifications have not been completely elucidated, patterns are shown between certain cancer cell types suggesting they may have important influence on function, localization and immunogenicity. Aside from its role in promoting glycolytic flux and anaerobic energy production, it has been shown to induce a specific humoral and cellular immune response. On all levels, hypoxia-induced over-expression of enolase 1 may possess important roles in hypoxic tumors including the most straightforward increase in anaerobic respiration.

2-phosphoglycerate (2PG)	enolase 1 Expression up-regulated by HIF-1	phosphoenolpyruvate (PEP)
	H_{2}O
	enolase 1

=== Pyruvate kinase expression ===
HIF-1 activated pyruvate kinase M comes in multiple isoforms known as PKM1 and PKM2. Pyruvate kinase is shown to convert phosphoenolpyruvate to pyruvate forming ATP from ADP. Along with phospho-fructokinase 1, pyruvate kinase is also allosterically activated by fructose-2,6-bisphosphate. In cancer cells pyruvate kinase M2 has been shown to interact directly with HIF-1α enhancing HIF-1 binding and p300 recruitment to hypoxia response elements. This positive feedback loop leads to HIF-1 transactivation and an amplified effect on glucose metabolism.

Pyruvate kinase M2 is often considered the main regulator of cancer metabolism with roles in various parallel, feed-forward, positive and negative feedback mechanisms. The genetic difference between pyruvate kinase M1 and pyruvate kinase M2 is only 22 out of 531 amino acids which makes an immense difference. Pyruvate kinase M2 has metabolic activity regulated by post-translational modifications including acetylation, oxidation, phosphorylation, hydroxylation and sumoylation. These different modifications can cause the shift from the metabolically active tetrameric form to the in-active monomeric form. The well-known EGFR-activated extracellular signal-regulated kinase 2 (ERK2) and death-associated protein kinase are both shown to bind and directly phosphorylate pyruvate kinase M2 leading to increased activity in the glycolysis pathway. In hypoxic conditions found in a solid tumor, pyruvate kinase M2 plays a large role in promoting anaerobic energy production.

phosphoenolpyruvate (PEP)	pyruvate kinase Expression up-regulated by HIF-1		pyruvate (Pyr)
	ADP + H^{+}	ATP

=== Pyruvate dehydrogenase kinase expression ===
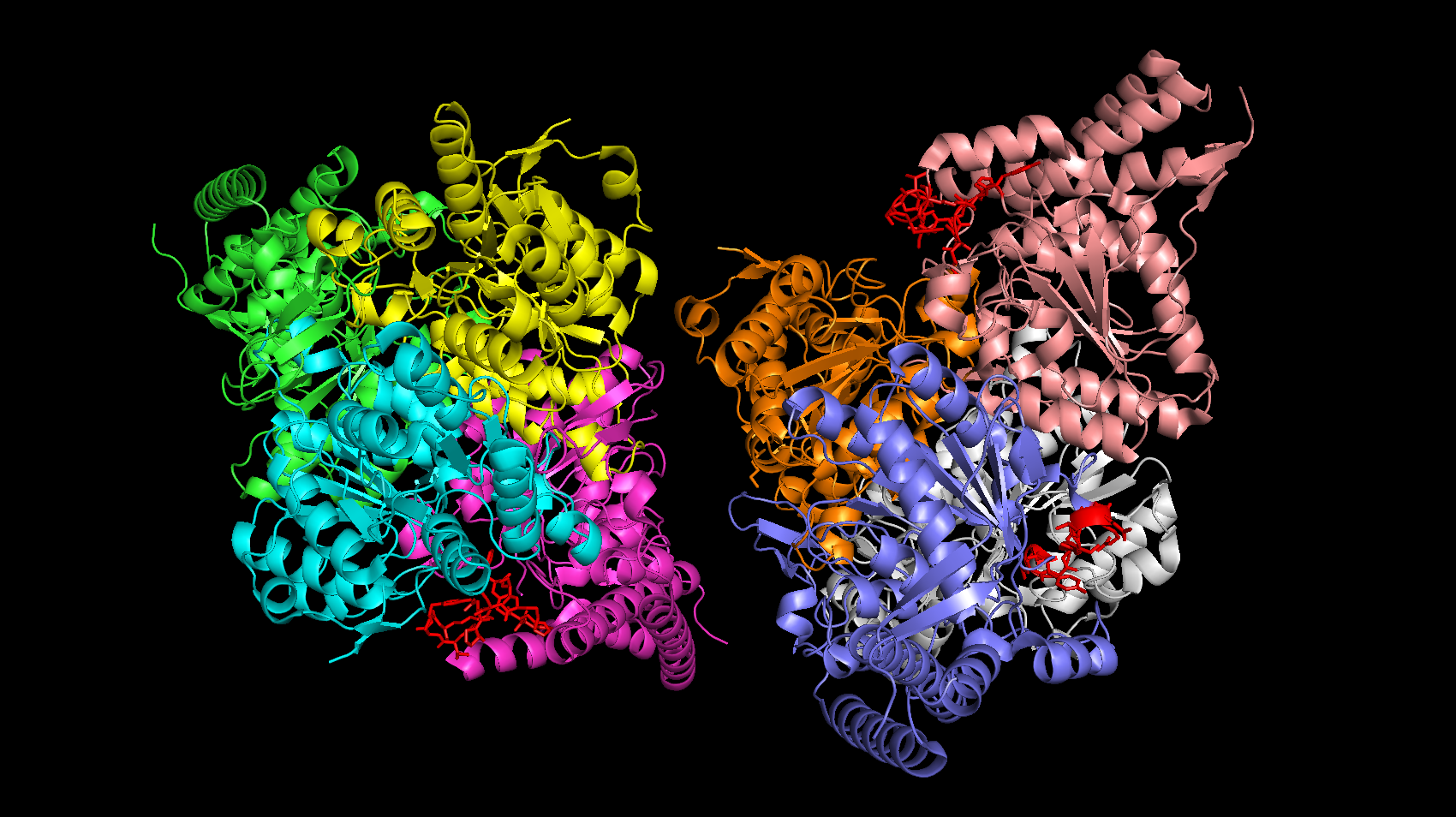
The areas surrounding the phosphorylation sites on pyruvate dehydrogenase are shown in red. Pyruvate dehydrogenase kinase phosphorylation of these sites leads to decreased dehydrogenase activity

Pyruvate dehydrogenase directly follows the glycolytic pathway and is responsible for the conversion of pyruvate to acetyl-CoA which enters into the TCA cycle. The TCA cycle, although not directly requiring oxygen, requires the cycling of NADH to NAD+ as performed by the electron transport chain under aerobic conditions. Under anaerobic conditions, such as those found in hypoxic tumors, the TCA cycle provides little ATP yield due to the lack of electron transport chain function. In order to direct the glycolytically produced pyruvate away from the TCA cycle, pyruvate dehydrogenase kinase is over-expressed in response to hypoxic conditions. Pyruvate dehydrogenase kinase is not a glycolytic enzymes but more of a glycolytic regulator. Pyruvate dehydrogenase kinases, transcriptionally activated by HIF-1 in hypoxic conditions, are responsible for phosphorylating the E1 subunit of pyruvate dehydrogenase ultimately suppressing its function. By inhibiting this specific pathway, the glycolytic products are directed away from the mitochondrial TCA cycle and towards lactate dehydrogenase.

=== Lactate dehydrogenase expression ===
Activated expression of lactate dehydrogenase A (LDH-A), parallels with deactivation of pyruvate dehydrogenase mediated by pyruvate dehydrogenase kinase. Subsequent inactivation of pyruvate dehydrogenase following phosphorylation and increased expression of lactate dehydrogenase A shunts pyruvate away from the mitochondrial TCA cycle. In many different tumor types lactate dehydrogenase A is found at elevated levels and has even been linked to poor prognosis and a greater metastatic potential The high levels of lactate production surface the question of whether lactate has some influence on the aggressive behaviour shown in hypoxic tumors.

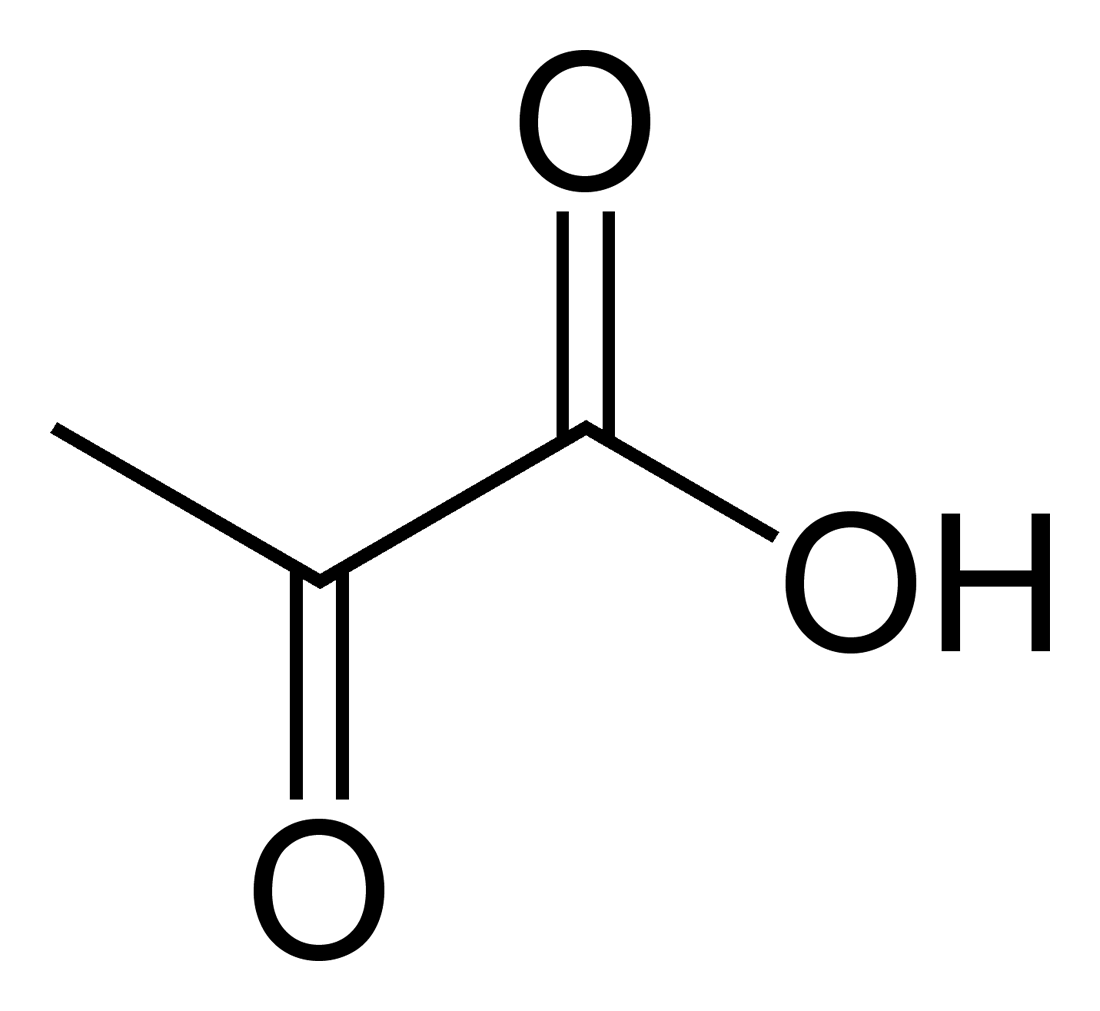
pyruvate	lactate dehydrogenase Expression up-regulated by HIF-1		Lactate
	NADH	NAD+
	lactate dehydrogenase

=== Overview of glycolytic changes and consequences ===
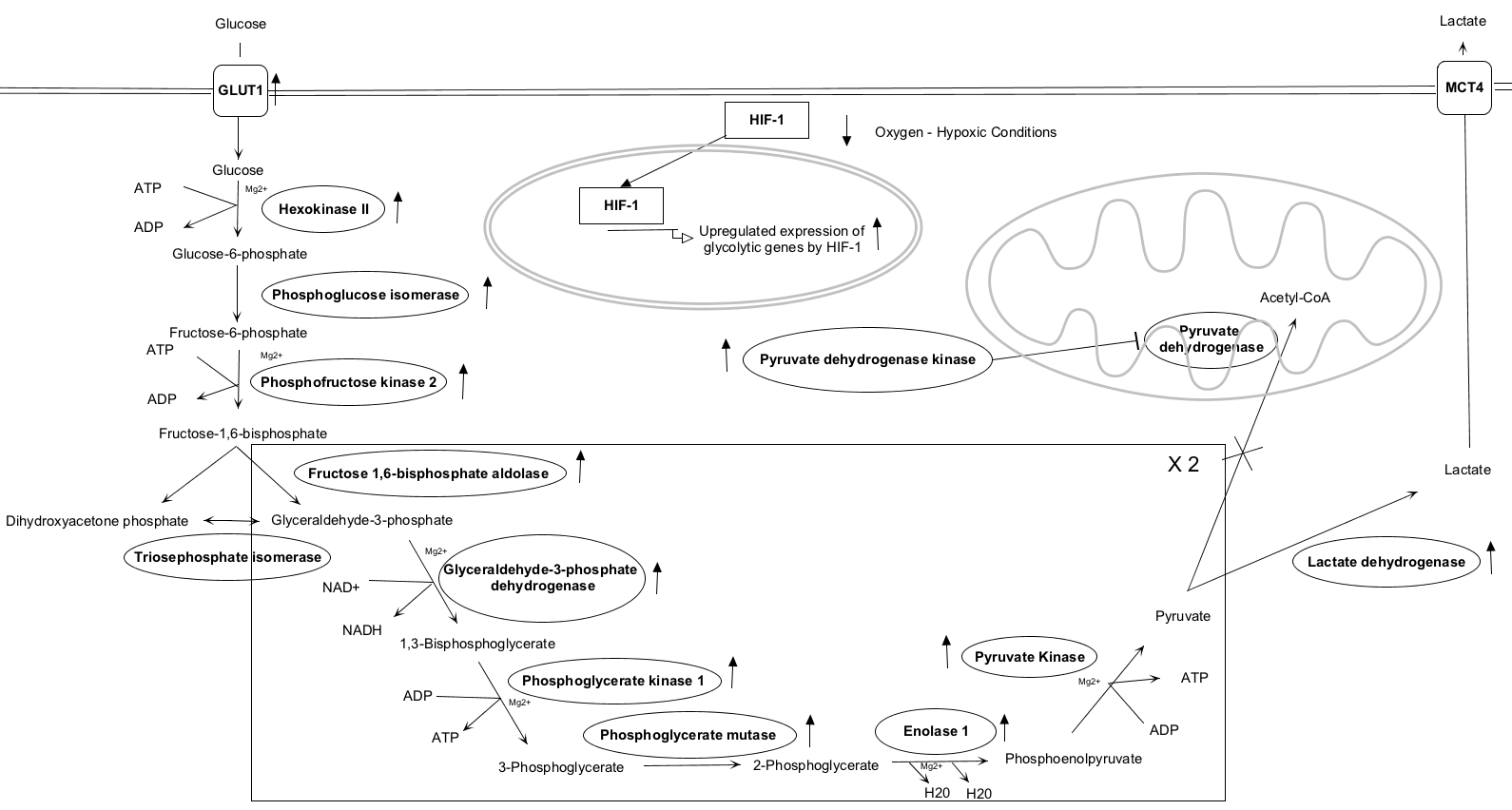
Overview of the HIF-1 effect on the expression of glycolytic enzymes

Increased expression of almost every glycolytic enzyme is seen in hypoxic tumor conditions. The over-expression of these proteins is mediated by HIF-1 and completely alters normal cellular metabolism. With decreases in the rate of mitochondrial oxidation, lactate and protons begin to accumulate. High levels of glycolysis and the production of lactate, as shown in hypoxic tumor cells, is hallmark of cancer cells even in the presence of oxygen.

To relieve tumors cells of acidosis, carbonic anhydrases appear to be highly expressed once again downstream of HIF-1 activation. These enzymes catalyze the reversible hydration of carbon dioxide into bicarbonate and protons. They also assist in acidifying the extracellular environment and maintaining a slightly alkaline intracellular compartments contributing to tumor cell survival. Lactate from the hypoxic tumor cells is excreted to the surrounding environment by carbonic anhydrase 9 and sodium-hydrogen exchanger 1 MCT4. Local aerobic cancer cells are thought to take up this lactate forming a metabolic symbiosis.

== Lactate and cancer ==
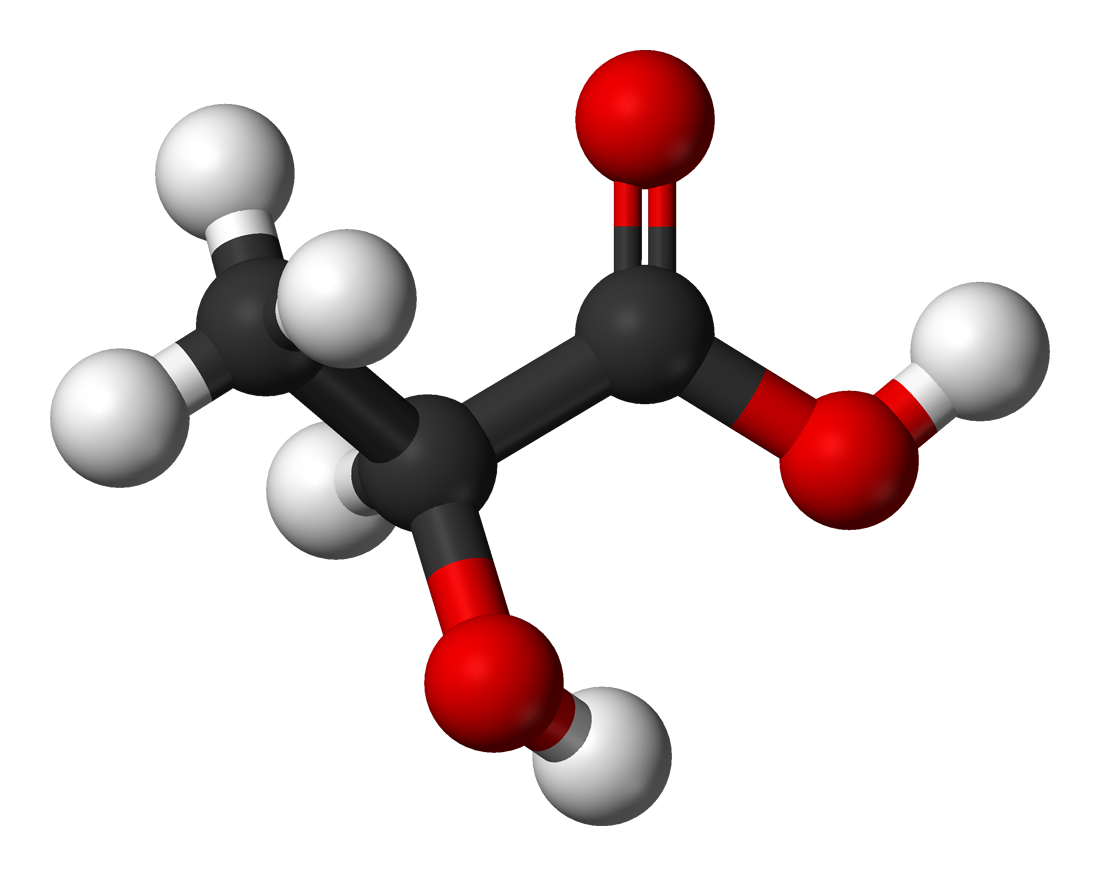
The Structure of Lactic Acid

It is commonly accepted that cancer cells (both hypoxic and normoxic) produce large amounts of lactate in result of a large metabolic shift from oxidative phosphorylation to altered glycolysis. The high levels of released lactate contribute to immune escape for the tumor cells. Activated T cells use glycolysis as an energy source and thus must regulate their own lactate levels. Traditionally done by a secretion method, immune cells in a lactate rich environment cannot rid themselves of their own lactate due to the concentration gradient. It is thought that leukocytes may be asphyxiated by lactate while low extracellular pHs may also reduce cytotoxic T-cell function.

In endothelial cells it has also been shown that lactate stimulates vascular endothelial growth factor (VEGF) production leading to enhanced cellular migration in result of lactate-induced angiogenesis Recent work has also uncovered that lactate uptake by MCT-1 in endothelial cells stimulates NF-κB activation and thus IL-8 expression. Release of lactate from tumor cells through MCT-4 was sufficient to stimulate angiogenesis and tumor growth through an IL-8-dependent mechanism.

Lactate has demonstrated the ability to increase hyaluronan production leading to elevated expression of CD44. Hyaluronan is a glycosaminoglycan polymer critical for maintaining extracellular matrix integrity and modulating cell-cell interactions. Hyaluronan is tethered to cell surfaces by CD44 which are anchored in caveolin-rich lipid rafts. Cleavage and further degradation of hyaluronan is facilitated by Hyal2 and Hyal1, respectively. Increased levels of hyaluronan surrounding carcinomas leads to the promotion of cellular growth and motility. A lactate-sensitive response element for genes in fibroblasts involved in hyaluronan metabolism has been identified.

Finally, it is also worth noting that lactate concentrations are positively correlated with radioresistance. Many anti-cancer therapies, including ionizing radiation and many chemotherapeutics, rely on the overproduction of reactive oxygen species to cause genomic instability. Lactate, as an antioxidant, may act to scrub down the levels of reactive oxygen species thus enhancing resistance to radiation and chemotherapy.

== Acidic microenvironment and metastasis ==
It is thought that the low pH of hypoxic tumors in result of high levels of lactic acid can promote tumor cell invasion by destruction of adjacent non-cancerous tissue. Carbonic anhydrase 9 involved in maintaining a slightly alkaline intracellular pH does so by removing carbonate from the extracellular space consequently acidifying the cells surroundings. Moreover, proton pumping from the hypoxic tumor cells further decreases the surrounding pH. On a completely different note, as briefly discussed above, the autocrine function of phosphoglucose isomerase also promotes cell motility and metastasis.

== Metabolic symbiosis ==
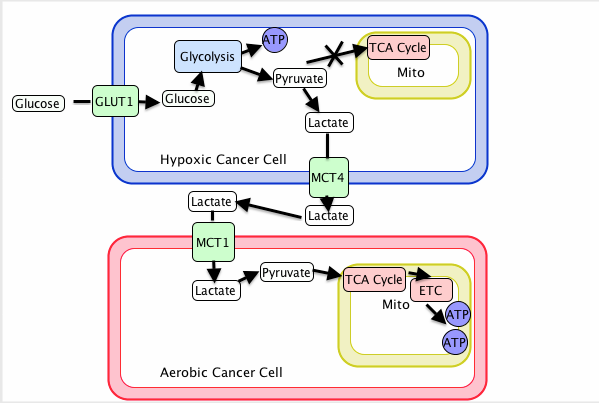
Schematic highlighting the metabolic symbiosis formed between hypoxic and normoxic tumor cells

With the hypoxic tumor cells consuming large amounts of glucose to maintain energy homeostasis, the tumor has found a way of using its resources most efficiently. The end glycolytic product of hypoxic tumors, lactate, is transported out of the hypoxic cell by monocarboxylate transporter 4 (MCT4) which is a hypoxia-induced transporter. The free lactate in the extracellular space is then taken up by monocarboxylate transporter 1 (MCT1) which is a non-hypoxia induced transporter found on the surface of aerobic cells. This transporter allows aerobic cancer cells to efficiently take up lactate, convert it back to pyruvate with the oxygen-dependent expression of lactate dehydrogenase B (LDH-B), and use it as an energy source. This frees these cells from requiring large quantities of glucose allowing the hypoxic cells to take up the majority of the available resources.

Tumor cells have also shown the remarkable ability to adapt to regional variation of oxygen availability. Cancer cells demonstrate the ability to be hypoxic at one point in time and aerobic at the next. This shows cyclic variations in oxygenation implying dynamic regulation of the metabolic symbiosis between lactate-producing and lactate-consuming states.

== The pentose phosphate pathway ==
In order to meet the demands of rapid tumor growth, the tumor must find ways to support the synthesis of a complete daughter cell while facing depleting nutrient supplies. They must coordinate production of precursors for macromolecular synthesis as well as maintain cellular bioenergetics without impairing cell growth, proliferation and viability. One way of doing this is by shuffling glycolytic intermediates such as glucose-6-phosphate into the pentose phosphate pathway to give ribose-5-phosphate and NADPH. Ribose-5-phosphate acts as an intermediate for the production of nucleotides thus providing a connection between glycolysis and nucleotide synthesis in hypoxic tumor cells. In cases where glycolysis remains highly active in normoxic conditions, NADPH acts as a mediator of antioxidative reactions to protect cells from oxidative damage.

== Cancer treatments and tumor hypoxia ==
=== Radiotherapy ===
The presence or absence of oxygen has a strong influence on ionizing radiation to cause cell death of tumor and normal cells. This is called the oxygen effect. Under hypoxic conditions it has been shown that cells obtain radioresistance through HIF-1 mediated mechanisms. To overcome this problem, radiation oncologists have developed powerful tools and approaches such as simultaneous integrated boost intensity-modulated radiation therapy (SIB-IMRT), which enables a booster dose of radiation to be delivered to small target fractions in a malignant tumor, hypoxia-selective cytotoxins/drugs, and HIF-1 inhibitors. Moreover, it is possible to treat a hypoxic tumor by means of ion beam therapy, in particular with carbon ions. As ions' damage is direct, OER (Oxygen Enhancement Ratio) is 1, so the effect of oxygen it is not important.

An important approach of hypoxia-related treatment interventions is a procedure called dose painting, in which a higher radiation dose is targeted to hypoxic subvolumes of tumor. However, one of the major challenges is a lack of clinically applicable method to detect tumor hypoxia. Accordingly, the evaluation of non-invasive hypoxia detection methods, such as positron emission tomography (PET) and magnetic resonance imaging (MRI), has been a subject of intense research for several years. PET imaging is the preferred method in clinical use, and the most investigated PET radiotracers for imaging of tumor hypoxia are 18F-FMISO, 18F-EF5, 18F-FAZA and 18F-HX4. The feasibility of hypoxia PET based dose painting is already being evaluated in a few interventional clinical trials.

=== Other treatment options ===
Bioreductive prodrugs play a significant part in dealing with these kinds of cells: they can kill the oxygen-deficient tumor cells selectively as hypoxia-activated prodrugs. Example drugs include Tirapazamine and Evofosfamide. The study of tumors in such conditions was pioneered by Dr L. H. Gray.

== Targeting tumor hypoxia to overcome metastasis ==
An association between tumor hypoxia and metastatic progression has been shown through numerous publications.

== Drug development ==
Several approaches have been taken to address tumor hypoxia. Some companies tried to develop drugs that are activated in hypoxic environments (Novacea, Inc. Proacta, Inc, Convert Pharmaceuticals, and Threshold Pharmaceuticals, Inc), while others are currently seeking to reduce tumor hypoxia (Diffusion Pharmaceuticals, Inc. and NuvOx Pharma, LLC).

Several companies have tried to develop drugs that are activated in hypoxic environments. These drug candidates target levels of hypoxia that are common in tumors but are rare in normal tissues. The hypoxic zones of tumors generally evade traditional chemotherapeutic agents and ultimately contribute to relapse. In the literature, hypoxia has been demonstrated to be associated with a worse prognosis, making it a determinant of cancer progression and therapeutic response Several review articles summarize the current status of hypoxic cytotoxins (hypoxia activated prodrugs). Companies that have tried drugs that are activated in hypoxic environments included Novacea, Inc. Proacta, Convert Pharmaceuticals and Threshold Pharmaceuticals. Novacea Inc discontinued development of its hypoxia activated drug. Proacta's drug PR610 failed a Phase I clinical trial due to toxicity. Threshold Pharmaceuticals discontinued the hypoxia activated prodrug, TH-302, after Phase III trials failed to show statistically significant overall survival.

As of 2025, Convert Pharmaceuticals's CP506, a DNA Alkylating agent, seems to be the only hypoxia activated prodrug ongoing clinical trials.

Niacinamide, the active form of vitamin B_{3}, acts as a chemo- and radio-sensitizing agent by enhancing tumor blood flow, thereby reducing tumor hypoxia. Niacinamide also inhibits poly(ADP-ribose) polymerases (PARP-1), enzymes involved in the rejoining of DNA strand breaks induced by radiation or chemotherapy. As of August 2016, no clinical trials appear to be in progress for this indication.

Another approach to the treatment of tumor hypoxia is the use of an oxygen diffusion-enhancing compound to reoxygenate the hypoxic zones of tumors. The developer of oxygen diffusion-enhancing compounds, Diffusion Pharmaceuticals, tested its lead compound, trans sodium crocetinate (TSC), in a Phase II clinical trial in 59 patients newly diagnosed with glioblastoma multiforme. The results of the Phase II showed that 36% of the full-dose TSC patients were alive at 2 years, compared with historical survival values ranging from 27% to 30% for the standard of care. The main endpoint of the trial was survival at two years, not overall survival.

Another drug in development that is designed to reduce tumor hypoxia is NuvOx Pharma's NVX-108. NVX-108 is a formulation of the perfluorocarbon, dodecafluoropentane (DDFPe). NVX-108 is injected intravenously, flows through the lungs and picks up oxygen, then flows through the arteries and releases oxygen in the presence of hypoxic tissue. A Phase Ib/II clinical trial is in progress for newly diagnosed glioblastoma multiforme. Early results have shown reversal of tumor hypoxia, and the trial continues to progress.

Another approach to target hypoxia is to use nanoparticles coated or loaded with specific targeting moieties. Although hyaluronic acid CD44 pathway to target cancer and cancer metastasis has been investigated before; Almoustafa et al. demonstrated that targeting CD44 receptors with Hyaluronic acid coated nanoparticles reduced drug resistance to doxorubicin compared to free drug and to non-targeted nanoparticles. However, more preclinical research should be conducted using hypoxia modeling in vitro and in vivo.

== See also ==
- Hypoxia
