= Dose fractionation =

Administration of a total dose of radiation in parts, at intervals

Dose fractionation effects are utilised in the treatment of cancer with radiation therapy. When the total dose of radiation is divided into several, smaller doses over a period of several days, there are fewer toxic effects on healthy cells. This maximizes the effect of radiation on cancer and minimizes the negative side effects. A typical fractionation scheme divides the dose into 30 units delivered every weekday over six weeks.

== Background ==
Experiments in radiation biology have found that as the absorbed dose of radiation increases, the number of cells which survive decreases. They have also found that if the radiation is fractionated into smaller doses, with one or more rest periods in between, fewer cells die. This is because of self-repair mechanisms which repair the damage to DNA and other biomolecules such as proteins. These mechanisms can be over expressed in cancer cells, so caution should be used in using results for a cancer cell line to make predictions for healthy cells if the cancer cell line is known to be resistant to cytotoxic drugs such as cisplatin. The DNA self repair processes in some organisms is exceptionally good; for instance, the bacterium Deinococcus radiodurans can tolerate a 15 000 Gy (1.5 MRad) dose.

This is a graph showing the effect of fractionation on the ability of gamma rays to cause cell death. The blue line is for cells which were not given a chance to recover; the red line is for cells which were allowed to stand for a time and recover.

In the graph to the right, called a cell survival curve, the dose vs. surviving fraction have been drawn for a hypothetical group of cells with and without a rest time for the cells to recover. Other than the recovery time partway through the irradiation, the cells would have been treated identically.

The human body contains many types of cells, and the human can be killed by the loss of a single type of cell in a vital organ. For many short-term radiation deaths due to what is commonly known as radiation sickness (3 to 30 days after exposure), it is the loss of bone marrow cells (which produce blood cells), and the loss of other cells in the wall of the intestines, that is fatal.

== Radiation fractionation as cancer treatment ==
Fractionation effects are utilised in the treatment of cancer with radiation therapy. When the total dose of radiation is divided into several, smaller doses over a period of several days, there are fewer toxic effects on healthy cells. This maximizes the effect of radiation on cancer and minimizes the negative side effects. A typical fractionation scheme divides the dose into 30 units delivered every weekday over six weeks. Recent approaches, such as the genomic adjusted radiation dose (GARD), use tumor-specific genomic information to estimate the biological effect of a given physical radiation dose to help personalize fractionation schemes for individual patients.

Hypofractionation is a treatment regimen that delivers higher doses of radiation in fewer visits. The logic behind this treatment is that applying greater amounts of radiation works to lower the effects of accelerated tumor growth that typically occurs during the later stages of radiotherapy. One trial for prostate cancer ran in 2011. In 2016 the HYPRO study reported results comparing the use of standard fractionation (39 fractions of 2 Gy for 8 weeks) with hypofractionation (with 19 fractions of 3.4 Gy for 6.5 weeks) among 820 patients with intermediate- or high-risk prostate cancer.

Hyperfractionation is dividing the same total dose into more deliveries. Treatments are given more than once a day. Hyperfractionated radiation therapy is given over the same period of time (days or weeks) as standard radiation therapy.

Accelerated fractionation (two deliveries per day and/or deliveries on weekends as well) has also been investigated.
