= PR-104 =

Chemical compound

Identifiers
- IUPAC name: [2-({2-[(2-Bromoethyl)[2-(methanesulfonyloxy)ethyl]amino]-3,5-dinitrophenyl}formamido)ethoxy]phosphonic acid
- CAS Number: 851627-62-8
- PubChem CID: 11455973
- ChemSpider: 9630821
- UNII: V16D2ZT7DT
- CompTox Dashboard (EPA): DTXSID001005607

Chemical and physical data
- Formula: C_{14}H_{20}BrN_{4}O_{12}PS
- Molar mass: 579.27 g·mol^{−1}
- 3D model (JSmol): Interactive image
- SMILES: CS(=O)(=O)OCCN(CCBr)c1c(cc(cc1[N+](=O)[O-])[N+](=O)[O-])C(=O)NCCOP(=O)(O)O
- InChI: InChI=1S/C14H20BrN4O12PS/c1-33(28,29)31-7-5-17(4-2-15)13-11(14(20)16-3-6-30-32(25,26)27)8-10(18(21)22)9-12(13)19(23)24/h8-9H,2-7H2,1H3,(H,16,20)(H2,25,26,27); Key:GZSOKPMDWVRVMG-UHFFFAOYSA-N

PR-104 is a drug from the class of hypoxia-activated prodrugs (HAPs), which is being researched as a potential anti-cancer therapeutic agent. It is a phosphate ester "pre-prodrug" that is rapidly converted to the HAP PR-104A in the body. PR-104A is in turn metabolised to reactive nitrogen mustard DNA crosslinking agents in hypoxic tissues such as found in solid tumours. Following initial clinical studies, it was discovered that PR-104A is also activated by the enzyme AKR1C3, independently of hypoxia. Hypoxia in the bone marrow of patients with leukaemia, and high activity of AKR1C3 in some leukaemia subtypes has led to interest in clinical trials of PR-104 in relapsed refractory acute leukaemias.
