= Genomic adjusted radiation dose =

Genomics-informed framework to personalize radiotherapy dose

Genomic adjusted radiation dose (GARD) is a framework in radiation oncology that estimates the biological effect of a given physical radiation dose by combining a tumor's gene-expression–derived radiosensitivity with a radiobiological dose–effect model (e.g. the linear–quadratic model).

== Radiation sensitivity index (RSI) ==
The radiation sensitivity index (RSI) is a gene-expression–based model developed to estimate the intrinsic radiosensitivity of tumor cells. RSI was created by correlating cancer cell line survival after ionizing radiation with baseline gene-expression patterns, identifying a set of genes predictive of cellular response to radiation.

RSI has been evaluated across multiple cancer types and clinical cohorts, and serves as the genomic basis of GARD.

== Background ==
Conventional radiotherapy is typically prescribed using fixed schedules (e.g. 2 Gy per fraction) that do not account for inter-tumor variability in radiosensitivity. Advances in genomic profiling and radiogenomic research have led to efforts to model how gene-expression patterns influence tumor response to radiation. Among these, the Genomic Adjusted Radiation Dose (GARD) framework was proposed to quantify the expected biological effectiveness of a given physical dose for an individual tumor, enabling genomically informed dose personalization.

Other methods to predict radiosensitivity have also been explored. These include integrative radiogenomic models that correlate tumor gene-expression with in vitro radiosensitivity, imaging-based proxies such as FDG-PET–derived voxel dose–response mapping using serial PET/CT feedback imaging, and mathematical frameworks such as the Proliferation–Saturation Index (PSI) and Dynamics-Adapted Radiotherapy Dose (DARD). Many of these approaches—including GARD—have primarily been evaluated in retrospective or observational settings, and prospective validation studies are ongoing.

== Origins and methodology ==
=== Radiosensitivity Index (RSI) ===
The foundation of GARD is the Radiosensitivity Index (RSI), derived from a 10-gene expression model trained to predict surviving fraction at 2 Gy (SF₂) in cell lines. Subsequent work refined the model via systems-biology/network modeling in two companion International Journal of Radiation Oncology • Biology • Physics papers in 2009.

=== Genomic Adjusted Radiation Dose (GARD) ===
GARD integrates RSI with the linear–quadratic formalism to estimate the biological effect of a given physical dose for an individual tumor was first introduced in 2017. A pooled pan-cancer analysis later examined GARD in multiple tumor types.

== Evidence and validation ==
=== RSI-only validation (pre-2017) ===
Following development of the RSI, several studies assessed its prognostic and predictive utility in human tumors. An early clinical validation in Breast cancer demonstrated that RSI was associated with clinical outcomes among patients receiving radiotherapy. Subsequent disease-specific analyses showed that RSI predicted overall survival in glioblastoma and in pancreatic cancer patients receiving adjuvant radiotherapy.

=== GARD-based validation (2017—present) ===
A pooled multi-cohort analysis across several cancers reported that GARD was associated with benefit from radiotherapy when analyzed alongside conventional dose metrics. Disease-specific applications include triple-negative breast cancer, lung metastases treated with stereotactic body radiotherapy, and HPV-positive oropharyngeal cancer (OPSCC). The body of literature to date is largely retrospective or observational; prospective evaluation is ongoing.

== Limitations and future directions ==
While GARD has demonstrated reproducible associations with radiotherapy outcomes across multiple cancers, several areas deserve continued refinement as the field moves toward personalized radiation dosing. Tumor heterogeneity, sampling bias, and variation in oxygenation and hypoxia distribution remain important considerations, as a single biopsy may not fully represent subclonal diversity or microenvironmental gradients that influence radiosensitivity. Classical tumor control probability (TCP) models also emphasize that dose–response relationships depend on tumor size, clonogen number, and spatial cell distribution, parameters not explicitly incorporated in current GARD formulations. Recent developments in imaging-based biomarkers, including radiomics and voxel-level dose–response mapping, offer complementary ways to characterize tumor biology and spatial heterogeneity that could further inform GARD-based planning. Ongoing work is focused on integrating genomic, imaging, and spatial data and on prospective and real-world evaluation to enhance the precision and generalizability of biologically informed radiotherapy dosing.

== Ongoing clinical trials ==
- NCT05528133 – Genomically Guided Radiation Therapy in Triple-Negative Breast Cancer (feasibility).
- NCT05873439 – Genomically Guided Radiation Dose Personalization in Locally Advanced NSCLC (feasibility).

== See also ==
- Radiosensitivity
- Radiogenomics
- Radiation therapy
- Personalized medicine
