= Cherenkov luminescence imaging =

Imaging modality

Cherenkov luminescence imaging (CLI) is an emerging imaging modality, similar to bioluminescence imaging, that captures visible photons emitted by Cherenkov radiation. It basically is the optical imaging of radiotracers that emit charged particles traveling faster than the phase velocity of light in that particular medium. It can be used to quickly evaluate radio tracers in preclinical research but also to obtain clinical images in patients. While radioactivity itself cannot be modified, the emitted light provides an opportunity to generate radioactivity-based activatable or "smart" imaging agents that sense for example enzymatic activity.
