= Cell survival curve =

Curve in radiobiology

== Introduction & History ==
The cell survival curve is a curve often used in radiobiology that represents the relationship between the amount of cells retaining reproductive capabilities and the absorbed dose of radiation from said cells. Tumor cells are able to grow infinitely, while normal cells must undergo treatment in order to grow indefinitely (see Cellular senescence). The cell survival curve refers to specific quantities of radiation that affect a cell's ability to reproduce. Very high amounts of radiation (10,000 rads or 100 Gy) can cause complete abatement of cellular function (cell death). These values are much larger when compared to the mean lethal dose of around 2 Gy that is required for loss of reproductive function. In order to gain an accurate estimate of the reproductive viability of cells in the face of radioactive stimulus, cells are generally subject to a Clonogenic assay. There are two generally accepted models that show significance towards cell-survival curves: the multi-hit (target theory) model and the repair model. The first mammalian cell radiation survival curve was developed by Puck and Marcus in 1956 examining the actions of x-rays on mammalian cells using HeLa cells.

=== Clonogenic Survival Assay With Survival Curves ===
Clonogenic survival assays are generally used to garner data for a cell survival curve. Clonogenic survival assays begin by harvesting from a growing cell stock through gentle scraping and application of Trypsin. Cells are then counted per unit volume manually (through application of Hemocytometer) or electrically. Cells are then isolated and incubated for a 1-2 week period. The plating efficiency is determined by the ratio of colonies observed and colonies plated. When viewing this in relation to the cell survival curve, separate cells are then plated parallel with increasing doses of radiation. Surviving fraction is the ratio between the number of colonies that survive said doses of radiation divided by the cells seeded when taking plating efficiency into account.

=== Cell Survival Curves ===
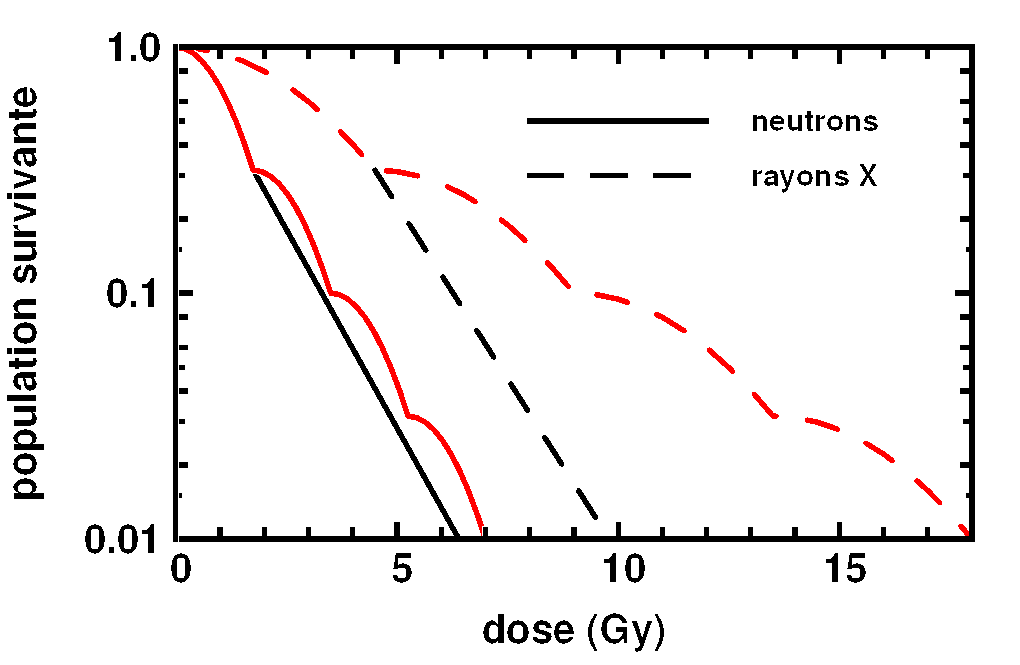
Proportions of surviving mammal cells to radiation as a function of its severity (in Gy). Black lines are acute radiations, while red lines are temporally fragmented. Solid lines represent neutron radiation and dashed lines X-ray radiation.

Cell survival curves are generally plotted as a Logarithmic surviving fraction of cells versus a linear dose of Radiation. There are two basic types of cell survival curves: Linear (exponential) or curved. Linear survival curves reflect cells irradiated with high LET radiation. The relationship between the surviving fraction (S) and the dose (D) is S = e^(-a)D where -a represents the slope. The relationship can also be expressed as S = e^(-D/D0) where D0 represents 1/a. When the dosage is equal to 1/A, S = 0.37 (or e^-1). For this reason, D0 is often called the mean lethal dose, the dose that creates one lethal event per target on average. Curved cell survival curves (cells exposed to low-LET radiation) show two distinct regions: low dose regions and high dose regions. The low-dose region is often referred to as the “shoulder”, and in this region there are fewer cell inactivations per unit dose. The high-dose region generally trends towards a straight line. Two general interpretations have been made on the differences between the low-dose region and the high dose region. One of these is the Target Theory, and the other interpretation reflects the efficiency of enzymatic repair diminishing with increased numbers of lesions, often referring to repair models.

== Different Models & Relationship to Cell Survival Curve ==
=== Target Theory (Multi-Hit) ===
Target Theory, often called the “multi hit model” when examining cell radiation, examines how ionizing radiation affects biological cell functions or survival. Target theory shows many different types of models that help to explain the role radiation plays in cell death or injury. The single-target single-hit model states that there is a single target that must be hit by radiation in order to inactive a cell. Essentially, radiation targeting in this model is random and must hit a specific location on the cell, such as the DNA, to inactivate it. The model that better aligns with Eukaryotic cells and the cell survival curve is the multi-target model. This model takes into account that there are multiple key components of the cell that must each be damaged with radiation in order to inactivate the cell. This introduces the “shoulder” seen in cell survival curves that represents the cell’s initial resistance to damage at lower doses of radiation before a linear curve is present over at higher doses.

=== Repair Models ===
Repair models have generally been brought about to scientific discussion in this scenario through the presence of the “shoulder” in low LET dose cells (curved cell-survival models). The shoulder of a low LET dose cell survival curve represents the point in which low doses of radiation do not diminish cell’s survivability to a point where an accumulation of said low dosages can cause a loss of cell reproduction. Some damage, fittingly, is thus dubbed “sublethal damage”. The repair model, instead of the target theory, emphasizes how a cell utilizes said cell’s repair mechanisms up to the limit of the cell’s repair machinery (the end of the shoulder). After the limit of the cell’s machinery is reached, the repair model generally notes that if any damage is left unhealed the dying process will be initiated. This differs from the target model’s idea that cell death occurs if a certain number of targets are hit.

=== Synthesis Between Two Models ===
Observations of the cell survival curve and the phenomenon of the shoulder help explain a multi-faceted approach towards what causes cell death from radiation. Synthesis of the repair models and the target theory help explain cell death in the face of radiation, noting two different mechanisms. There has been academic debate over exact mechanisms facing cell survival in radiation. These models reflect the fact that cell survival fractions are exponential functions with a dose-dependent term in the exponent due to the Poisson statistics underlying the Stochastic process.

== Application of the Cell Survival Curve & Current Research ==
The cell survival curve has a multitude of practical applications when it comes to Physiology, medicine, etc. One such application is Dose–response relationship, or the examination of the minimum required dose of radiation it takes to receive certain therapeutic outcomes including cell inactivation. There are clinical applications that highlight things such as Focused ultrasound and Gamma knife surgeries and procedures to treat brain tumors, abnormal blood vessels, etc. These rely on precision of radiation doses as represented through cell survival curves. Radiation treatment has grown in prevalence and the cell survival curve has important implications in many facets of radiation treatments and procedures. Recent research has proposed the idea that HeLa cells damaged with radiation (cells that are unique in that they have short-shouldered survival curves and two peaks of radio resistance during the cell cycle phase) show the fact that radio-suppression is mediated by intra-s checkpoints and reduces survival of cells in the s-phase. This information is relatively new and could possibly be extrapolated onto other types of cells.

== See also ==
- Dose fractionation
- Dose–response relationship
- Chronic radiation syndrome
