= Journal of Biomedical Optics =

- Cover for September issue of this journal
- Discipline: Biomedical optics
- Language: English
- Edited by: Muyinatu Bell

Publication details
- History: 1996–present
- Publisher: SPIE
- Frequency: Monthly
- Open access: yes
- License: CC-BY 4.0
- Impact factor: 2.9 (2024)

Standard abbreviations
- ISO 4: J. Biomed. Opt.

Indexing
- CODEN: JBOPFO
- ISSN: 1083-3668 (print); 1560-2281 (web)
- LCCN: 96656614
- OCLC no.: 32795913

Links
- Journal homepage; Online access; Online archive

The Journal of Biomedical Optics is a monthly peer-reviewed scientific journal published by SPIE. It covers the application of optical technology to health care, biomedical research, and experimental medicine. The editor-in-chief is Muyinatu Bell (Johns Hopkins University).

== Abstracting and indexing ==
This journal is abstracted and indexed in:

- Science Citation Index
- Current Contents/ Life Sciences
- Current Contents/ Engineering, Computing & Technology
- Chemical Abstracts Service
- Inspec
- Scopus
- EI/Compendex
- Astrophysics Data System
- MEDLINE/PubMed
- BIOSIS Previews

According to the Journal Citation Reports, the journal had a 2014 impact factor of 2.859, ranking it 12th out of 86 journals in the category "Optics", 31st out of 79 journals in the category "Biochemical Research Methods", and 31st out of 125 journals in the category "Radiology, Nuclear Medicine & Medical Imaging".
