= Tirapazamine =

Chemical compound

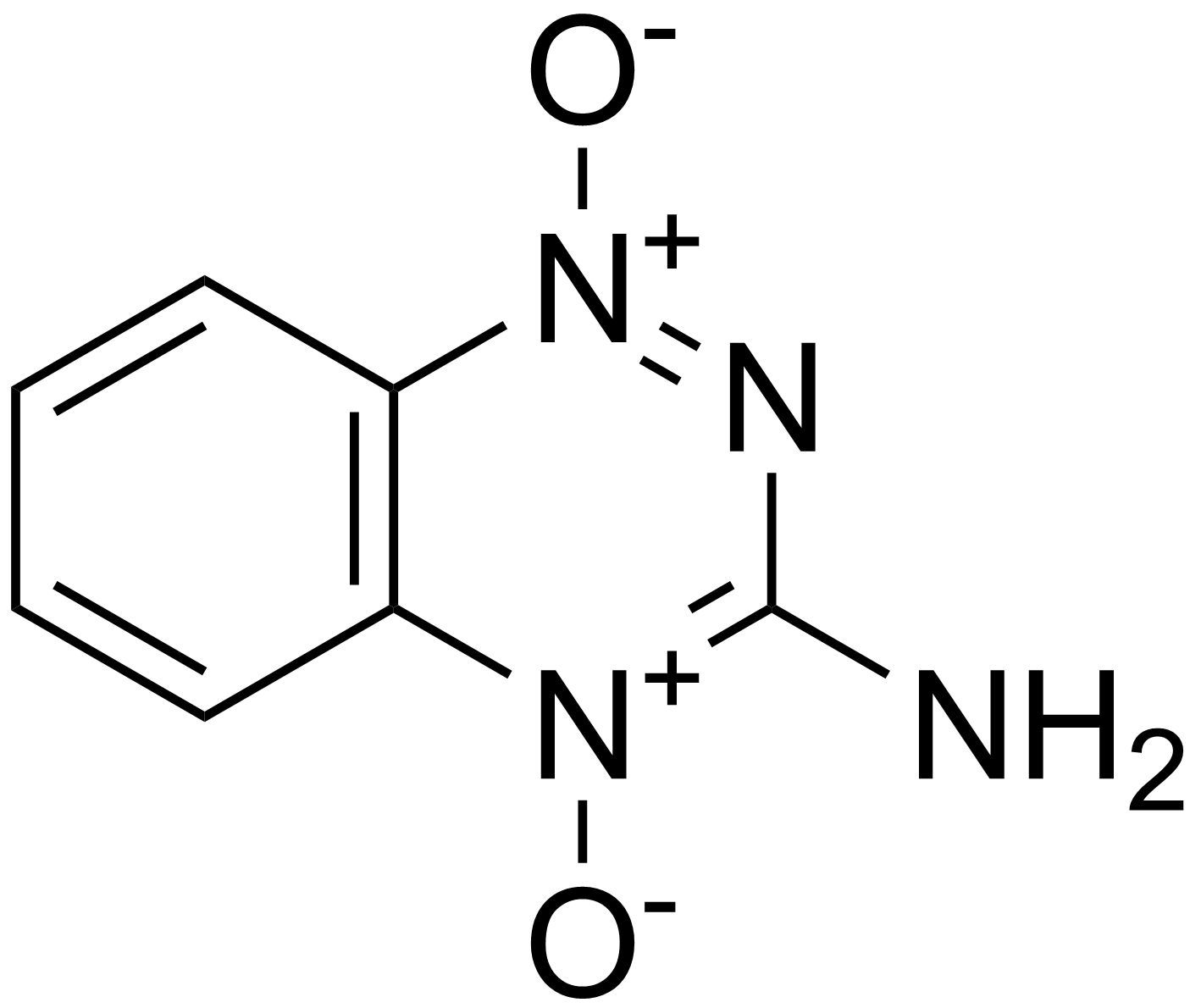

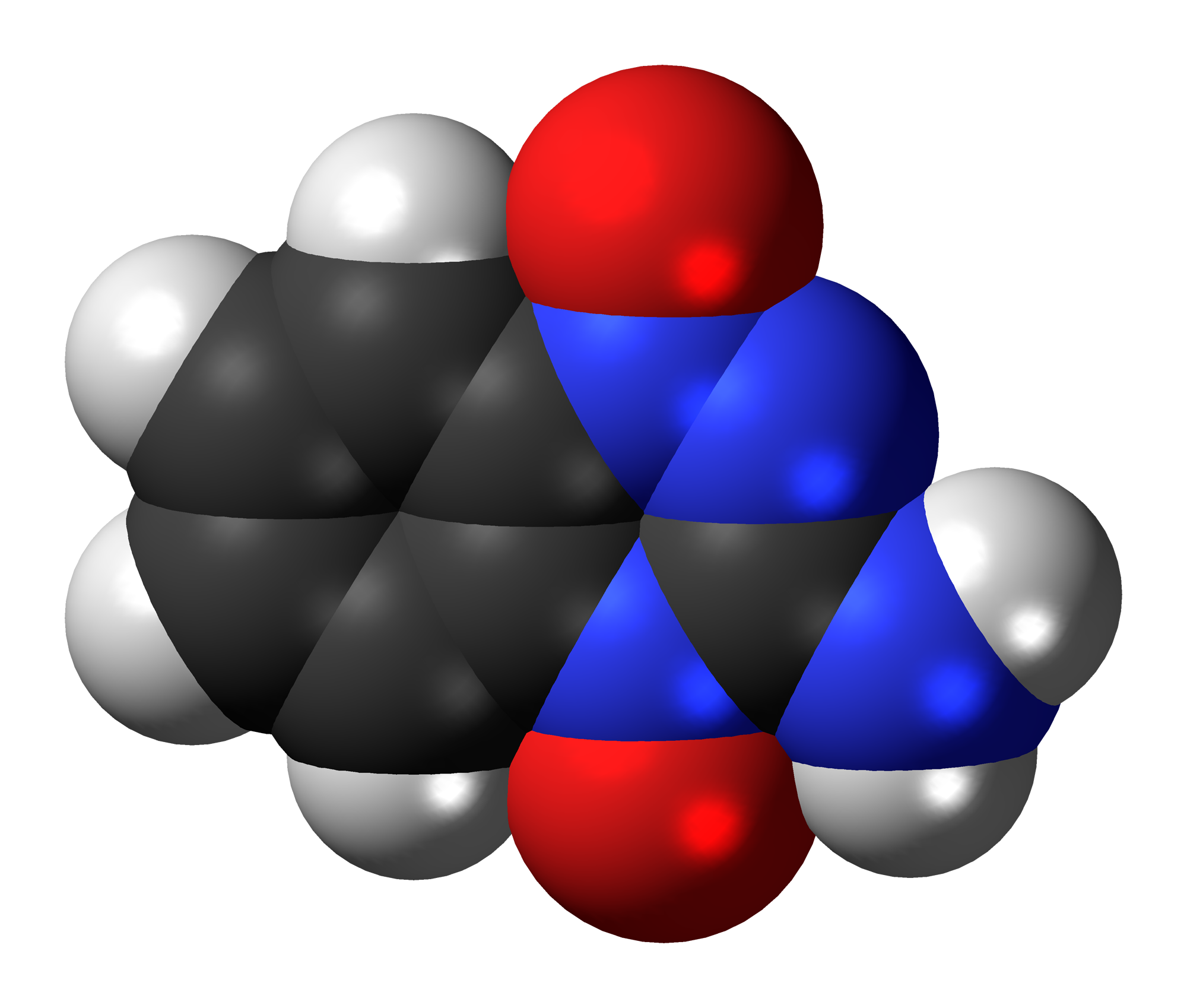

Clinical data
- ATC code: none

Identifiers
- IUPAC name: 4-hydroxy-1-oxido-1,2,4-benzotriazin-1-ium-3-imine
- CAS Number: 27314-97-2
- PubChem CID: 33776
- ChemSpider: 10437748
- UNII: 1UD32YR59G
- KEGG: D06167
- ChEBI: CHEBI:78887
- ChEMBL: ChEMBL50882
- ECHA InfoCard: 100.164.453

Chemical and physical data
- Formula: C_{7}H_{6}N_{4}O_{2}
- Molar mass: 178.151 g·mol^{−1}
- 3D model (JSmol): Interactive image
- SMILES: C1=CC=C2C(=C1)N(C(=N)N=[N+]2[O-])O
- InChI: InChI=1S/C7H6N4O2/c8-7-9-11(13)6-4-2-1-3-5(6)10(7)12/h1-4H,(H2,8,9); Key:ORYDPOVDJJZGHQ-UHFFFAOYSA-N

Tirapazamine (SR-4233, WIN 59075) is an experimental anticancer drug that is activated to a toxic radical only at very low levels of oxygen (hypoxia). Such levels are common in human solid tumors, a phenomenon known as tumor hypoxia. Thus, tirapazamine is activated to its toxic form preferentially in the hypoxic areas of solid tumors. Cells in these regions are resistant to killing by radiotherapy and most anticancer drugs. Thus the combination of tirapazamine with conventional anticancer treatments is particularly effective. As of 2006, tirapazamine is undergoing phase III testing in patients with head and neck cancer and gynecological cancer, and similar trials are being undertaken for other solid tumor types.

Chemically it is an aromatic heterocycle di-N-oxide. Its full chemical name is 3-amino-1,2,4-benzotriazine-1,4 dioxide. Originally it was prepared in a program screening for new herbicides in 1972. Its clinical use was first described by Zeman et al. in 1986. While tirapazamine has had only limited effectiveness in clinical trials, it has been used as a lead compound to develop a number of newer compounds with improved anti-cancer properties.

An update of a Phase III trial (Tirapazamine, cisplatin, and radiation versus cisplatin and radiation for advanced squamous cell carcinoma of the head and neck (TROG 02.02, HeadSTART): a phase III trial of the Trans-Tasman Radiation Oncology Group) found no evidence that the addition of TPZ to chemoradiotherapy, in patients with advanced head and neck cancer not selected for the presence of hypoxia, improved overall survival.

Two possible molecular mechanisms of TPZ, for generating reactive oxygen species which causes DNA strand break, have been considered widely. In hypoxia, under bioreductive condition, it has been observed that TPZ primarily produces hydroxyl or and benzotriazinyl radicals as the DNA damaging reactive species.

A new clinical phase I trial of Tirapazamine combined with embolization in liver cancer has been received in June, 2014. This study will help to optimize the safe tolerable dose of TPZ, when it is administered with embolization in liver cancer. Treatment of solid tumors is complicated by the fact that these are often poorly provided with blood vessels, thus limiting their exposure to cytotoxic agents. Attempts have, however, been made to take advantage of the resulting hypoxic environment by designing drugs that are nonreactive until they are reduced to reactive species in oxygen-deficient tissues. This, it is hoped, will lead to enhanced selectivity. The azaquinoxaline dioxide function on the antineoplastic agent tirapazamine, for example, has been shown to give reactive nitroxide radicals on reduction.

== Synthesis ==
Synthesis: Patent:

The condensation of 2-nitroaniline [88-74-4] (1) with cyanamide [420-04-2] (2) probably initially involves the formation of guanidinonitrobenzene [70973-04-5] (3). The very basic nitrogen in that species then condenses with the adjacent nitro group, closing the ring to give 1,2,4-Benzotriazin-3-amine 1-oxide [5424-06-6] (4). Oxidation with hydrogen peroxide then completes the preparation of tirapazamine (5).
