= Oxygen enhancement ratio =

The oxygen enhancement ratio (OER) or oxygen enhancement effect in radiobiology refers to the enhancement of therapeutic or detrimental effect of ionizing radiation due to the presence of oxygen. This so-called oxygen effect is most notable when cells are exposed to an ionizing radiation dose.

The OER is traditionally defined as the ratio of radiation doses during lack of oxygen compared to no lack of oxygen for the same biological effect. This may give varying numerical values depending on the chosen biological effect. Additionally, OER may be presented in terms of hyperoxic environments and/or with altered oxygen baseline, complicating the significance of this value.

$$OER = \frac{Radiation\, dose\, in\, hypoxia} {Radiation\, dose\, in\, air}$$

The maximum OER depends mainly on the ionizing density or LET of the radiation. Radiation with higher LET and higher relative biological effectiveness (RBE) have a lower OER in mammalian cell tissues. The value of the maximum OER varies from about 1–4. The maximum OER ranges from about 2–4 for low-LET radiations such as X-rays, beta particles and gamma rays, whereas the OER is unity for high-LET radiations such as low energy alpha particles.

== Uses in medicine ==
The effect is used in medical physics to increase the effect of radiation therapy in oncology treatments. Additional oxygen abundance creates additional free radicals and increases the damage to the target tissue.

In solid tumors the inner parts become less oxygenated than normal tissue and up to three times higher dose is needed to achieve the same tumor control probability as in tissue with normal oxygenation.

== Explanation of the Oxygen Effect ==
The best known explanation of the oxygen effect is the oxygen fixation hypothesis which postulates that oxygen permanently fixes radical-induced DNA damage so it becomes permanent. Recently, it has been posited that the oxygen effect involves radiation exposures of cells causing their mitochondria to produce greater amounts of reactive oxygen species.

== See also ==
- Radiation therapy
- Radiobiology
- Health physics
- Hypoxia
- Oxygen effect
