= Department of Medical Physics (University of Wisconsin–Madison) =

Academic department at the University of Wisconsin–Madison

- Type: Academic department
- Established: 1981
- Founder: John R. Cameron
- Parent institution: University of Wisconsin School of Medicine and Public Health
- Chair: Michael Speidel
- Location: Madison, Wisconsin, Wisconsin, United States
- Graduate-program accreditation: CAMPEP (since 1988)
- Website: medphysics.wisc.edu

The Department of Medical Physics is an academic department in the School of Medicine and Public Health at the University of Wisconsin–Madison, in Madison, Wisconsin. It developed from a medical physics program begun in 1958 by physicist John R. Cameron. In 1981, the program became a freestanding department, described as the first department of medical physics in the United States. Its graduate program offers Master of Science and Doctor of Philosophy degrees and has been accredited by the Commission on Accreditation of Medical Physics Education Programs (CAMPEP) since 1988. The graduate program regularly admits 15-20 students per year, for a total of approximately 90 enrolled, making this the largest CAMPEP accredited graduate program based solely in medical physics.

== History ==
In 1958, Cameron joined the University of Wisconsin–Madison Department of Radiology with a joint appointment in physics. Working with Halvor Vermund of Radiology, he began developing a program in nuclear medicine and medical physics, attracting physics students to undertake research in the field. By 1966, Cameron had supervised students completing 11 master's degrees and one doctorate; degrees at the time were awarded through either the Department of Physics or Radiological Sciences, then a section of the Department of Radiology.

In 1981, the Medical Physics Section of Radiology included 17 faculty and collateral faculty members. That year, the university established a freestanding Department of Medical Physics within its medical school, while many faculty retained partial appointments in Radiology or Human Oncology. Cameron was the department's founding chair and served in the role until his retirement in 1986.

The graduate program received CAMPEP accreditation in 1988. The department has stated that, together with Wayne State University, it was among the first medical physics programs to receive this accreditation.

== Chairs ==
The following individuals have served as chair of the department:

- John R. Cameron (1981–1985)
- Herb Attix (1985–1987)
- Paul M. DeLuca Jr. (1987–1998)
- James A. Zagzebski (1998–2013)
- Edward F. Jackson (2013–2019)
- Timothy J. Hall - (2020–2022)
- Brian W. Pogue (2022–2025)
- Michael A. Speidel (2025–present)
