= Radiosensitivity =

Susceptibility of cells to radiation

Radiosensitivity is the relative susceptibility of cells, tissues, organs or organisms to the harmful effect of ionizing radiation.

== Cells types affected ==
Cells are least sensitive when in the S phase, then the G_{1} phase, then the G_{2} phase, and most sensitive in the M phase of the cell cycle. This is described by the 'law of Bergonié and Tribondeau', formulated in 1906: X-rays are more effective on cells which have a greater reproductive activity.

From their observations, they concluded that quickly dividing tumor cells are generally more sensitive than the majority of body cells. This is not always true. Tumor cells can be hypoxic and therefore less sensitive to X-rays because most of their effects are mediated by the free radicals produced by ionizing oxygen.

It has meanwhile been shown that the most sensitive cells are those that are undifferentiated, well nourished, dividing quickly and highly active metabolically. Amongst the body cells, the most sensitive are spermatogonia and erythroblasts, epidermal stem cells, gastrointestinal stem cells. The least sensitive are nerve cells and muscle fibers.

Very sensitive cells are also oocytes and lymphocytes, although they are resting cells and do not meet the criteria described above. The reasons for their sensitivity are not clear.

There also appears to be a genetic basis for the varied vulnerability of cells to ionizing radiation. This has been demonstrated across several cancer types and in normal tissues. Recent efforts to bring genomic information into clinical dosing regimens, like the genomic adjusted radiation dose (GARD), have also been validated in a number of disease sites like HPV-positive oropharyngeal cancer (OPSCC),, triple-negative breast cancer, and in pan-cancer studies.

== Cell damage classification ==
The damage to the cell can be lethal (the cell dies) or sublethal (the cell can repair itself). Cell damage can ultimately lead to health effects which can be classified as either Tissue Reactions or Stochastic Effects according to the International Commission on Radiological Protection.

=== Tissue reactions ===
Tissue reactions have a threshold of irradiation under which they do not appear and above which they typically appear. Fractionation of dose, dose rate, the application of antioxidants and other factors may affect the precise threshold at which a tissue reaction occurs. Tissue reactions include skin reactions (epilation, erythema, moist desquamation), cataracts, circulatory disease, and other conditions. Seven proteins were identified in a systematic review, which correlated with radiosensitivity in normal tissues: γH2AX, TP53BP1, VEGFA, CASP3, CDKN2A, IL6, and IL1B.

=== Stochastic effects ===
Stochastic effects do not have a threshold of irradiation, are coincidental, and cannot be avoided. They can be divided into somatic and genetic effects. Among the somatic effects, secondary cancer is the most important. It develops because radiation causes DNA mutations directly and indirectly. Direct effects are those caused by ionizing particles and rays themselves, while the indirect effects are those that are caused by free radicals, generated especially in water radiolysis and oxygen radiolysis. The genetic effects confer the predisposition of radiosensitivity to the offspring. The process is not well understood yet.

=== Target structures ===
For decades, the main cellular target for radiation induced damage was thought to be the DNA molecule. This view has been challenged by data indicating that in order to increase survival, the cells must protect their proteins, which in turn repair the damage in the DNA. An important part of protection of proteins (but not DNA) against the detrimental effects of reactive oxygen species (ROS), which are the main mechanism of radiation toxicity, is played by non-enzymatic complexes of manganese ions and small organic metabolites. These complexes were shown to protect the proteins from oxidation in vitro and also increased radiation survival in mice. An application of the synthetically reconstituted protective mixture with manganese was shown to preserve the immunogenicity of viral and bacterial epitopes at radiation doses far above those necessary to kill the microorganisms, thus opening a possibility for a quick whole-organism vaccine production. The intracellular manganese content and the nature of complexes it forms (both measurable by electron paramagnetic resonance) were shown to correlate with radiosensitivity in bacteria, archaea, fungi and human cells. An association was also found between total cellular manganese contents and their variation, and clinically inferred radioresponsiveness in different tumor cells, a finding that may be useful for more precise radiodosages and improved treatment of cancer patients.

== See also ==
- Background radiation
- Cell death
- Lethal dose, LD50
- LNT model, Linear no-threshold response model for ionizing radiation
- Radiation sensitivity, the susceptibility of a material to physical or chemical changes induced by radiation
