= Bragg peak =

Path length of maximum energy loss of ionizing radiation

The Bragg curve of 5.49 MeV alphas in air has its peak to the right and is skewed to the left, unlike the x-ray beam below.

The Bragg peak is a pronounced peak on the Bragg curve which plots the energy loss of ionizing radiation during its travel through matter. For protons, α-rays, and other ion rays, the peak occurs immediately before the particles come to rest. It is named after William Henry Bragg, who discovered it in 1903 using alpha particles from radium, and wrote the first empirical formula for ionization energy loss per distance with Richard Kleeman.

When a fast charged particle moves through matter, it ionizes atoms of the material and deposits a dose along its path. A peak occurs because the interaction cross section increases as the charged particle's energy decreases. Energy lost by charged particles is inversely proportional to the square of their velocity, which explains the peak occurring just before the particle comes to a complete stop. In the upper figure, it is the peak for alpha particles of 5.49 MeV moving through air. In the lower figure, it is the narrow peak of the "native" proton beam curve which is produced by a particle accelerator of 250 MeV. The term "straggling" is used to describe the fact that, even for particles of the same mass and energy, probabilistic variations in the path each particle takes will lead to Bragg peaks at different depths. The Bragg peak of a beam, as the sum of many Bragg peaks caused by individual particles, is located at the average depth of its constituent peaks. The figure also shows the absorption of a beam of energetic photons (X-rays) which is entirely different in nature; the curve is mainly exponential.

The dose produced by a native and by a modified proton beam in passing through tissue, compared to the absorption of a photon or x-ray beam

This characteristic of proton beams was first recommended for use in cancer therapy by Robert R. Wilson in his 1946 article, "Radiological Use of Fast Protons". Wilson studied how the depth of proton beam penetration could be controlled by the energy of the protons. This phenomenon is exploited in particle therapy of cancer, specifically in proton therapy, to concentrate the effect of light ion beams on the tumor being treated while minimizing the effect on the surrounding healthy tissue.

The blue curve in the figure ("modified proton beam") shows how the originally monoenergetic proton beam with the sharp peak is widened by increasing the range of energies, so that a larger tumor volume can be treated. The plateau created by modifying the proton beam is referred to as the spread out Bragg Peak, or SOBP, which allows the treatment to conform to not only larger tumors, but to more specific 3D shapes. This can be achieved by using variable thickness attenuators like spinning wedges. Momentum cooling in cyclotron-based proton therapy facilities enables a sharper distal fall-off of the Bragg peak and the attainment of high dose rates.

As shown in the plots above, there is a limited range for the particles in a material. The Bragg–Kleeman rule is a way to estimate a particle's range in a medium, serving as a tool in particle detection and dosimetry. The basic form of the rule is:

$$\frac{R_1}{R_2} = \frac{\rho_2 \sqrt{A_1}}{\rho_1 \sqrt{A_2}}$$

where R_{1} and R_{2} are the ranges of two particles, ρ_{1} and ρ_{2} are the densities of the media they traverse, and A_{1} and A_{2} are the atomic weights of the respective mediums.

== See also ==
- Stopping power (particle radiation)
- Bremsstrahlung
- Linear energy transfer
- Proton therapy
