= Particle therapy =

Treatment of cancer using high-energy particles

- ICD-9: 92.26

Particle therapy is a form of external beam radiotherapy using beams of energetic neutrons, protons, or other heavier positive ions for cancer treatment. The most common type of particle therapy as of August 2021 is proton therapy.

In contrast to X-rays (photon beams) used in older radiotherapy, particle beams exhibit a Bragg peak in energy loss through the body, delivering their maximum radiation dose at or near the tumor and minimizing damage to surrounding normal tissues.

Particle therapy is also referred to more technically as hadron therapy, excluding photon and electron therapy. Neutron capture therapy, which depends on a secondary nuclear reaction, is also not considered here. Muon therapy, a rare type of particle therapy not within the categories above, has also been studied theoretically; however, muons are still most commonly used for imaging, rather than therapy.

== Method ==
Unlike electrons or X-rays, the dose from protons to tissue is maximum just over the last few millimeters of the particle's range.

Particle therapy works by aiming energetic ionizing particles at the target tumor. These particles damage the DNA of tissue cells, ultimately causing their death. Because of their reduced ability to repair DNA, cancerous cells are particularly vulnerable to such damage.

The figure shows how beams of electrons, X-rays or protons of different energies (expressed in MeV) penetrate human tissue. Electrons have a short range and are therefore only of interest close to the skin (see electron therapy). Bremsstrahlung X-rays penetrate more deeply, but the dose absorbed by the tissue then shows the typical exponential decay with increasing thickness. For protons and heavier ions, on the other hand, the dose increases while the particle penetrates the tissue and loses energy continuously. Hence the dose increases with increasing thickness up to the Bragg peak that occurs near the end of the particle's range. Beyond the Bragg peak, the dose drops to zero (for protons) or almost zero (for heavier ions).

The advantage of this energy deposition profile is that less energy is deposited into the healthy tissue surrounding the target tissue. This enables higher dose prescription to the tumor, theoretically leading to a higher local control rate, as well as achieving a low toxicity rate.

The ions are first accelerated by means of a cyclotron or synchrotron. The final energy of the emerging particle beam defines the depth of penetration, and hence, the location of the maximum energy deposition. Since it is easy to deflect the beam by means of electro-magnets in a transverse direction, it is possible to employ a raster scan method, i.e., to scan the target area quickly, as the electron beam scans a cathode ray tube. If, in addition, the beam energy and hence the depth of penetration is varied, an entire target volume can be covered in three dimensions, providing an irradiation exactly following the shape of the tumor. This is one of the great advantages compared to conventional X-ray therapy.

At the end of 2008, 28 treatment facilities were in operation worldwide and over 70,000 patients had been treated by means of pions, protons and heavier ions. Most of this therapy has been conducted using protons.

At the end of 2013, 105,000 patients had been treated with proton beams, and approximately 13,000 patients had received carbon-ion therapy.

As of April 1, 2015, for proton beam therapy, there are 49 facilities in the world, including 14 in the US with another 29 facilities under construction. For Carbon-ion therapy, there are eight centers operating and four under construction. Carbon-ion therapy centers exist in Japan, Germany, Italy, and China. Two US federal agencies are hoping to stimulate the establishment of at least one US heavy-ion therapy center.

== Proton therapy ==
Proton therapy is a type of particle therapy that uses a beam of protons to irradiate diseased tissue, most often to treat cancer. The chief advantage of proton therapy over other types of external beam radiotherapy (e.g., radiation therapy, or photon therapy) is that the dose of protons is deposited over a narrow range of depth, which results in minimal entry, exit, or scattered radiation dose to healthy nearby tissues. High dose rates are key in cancer treatment advancements. PSI demonstrated that for cyclotron-based proton therapy facility using momentum cooling, it is possible to achieve remarkable dose rates of 952 Gy/s and 2105 Gy/s at the Bragg peak (in water) for 70 MeV and 230 MeV beams, respectively. When combined with field-specific ridge filters, Bragg peak-based FLASH proton therapy becomes feasible.

== Fast-neutron therapy ==
Fast neutron therapy utilizes high energy neutrons typically between 50 and 70 MeV to treat cancer. Most fast neutron therapy beams are produced by reactors, cyclotrons (d+Be) and linear accelerators. Neutron therapy is currently available in Germany, Russia, South Africa and the United States. In the United States, the only treatment center still operational is in Seattle, Washington. The Seattle center use a cyclotron which produces a proton beam impinging upon a beryllium target.

== Carbon ion radiotherapy ==
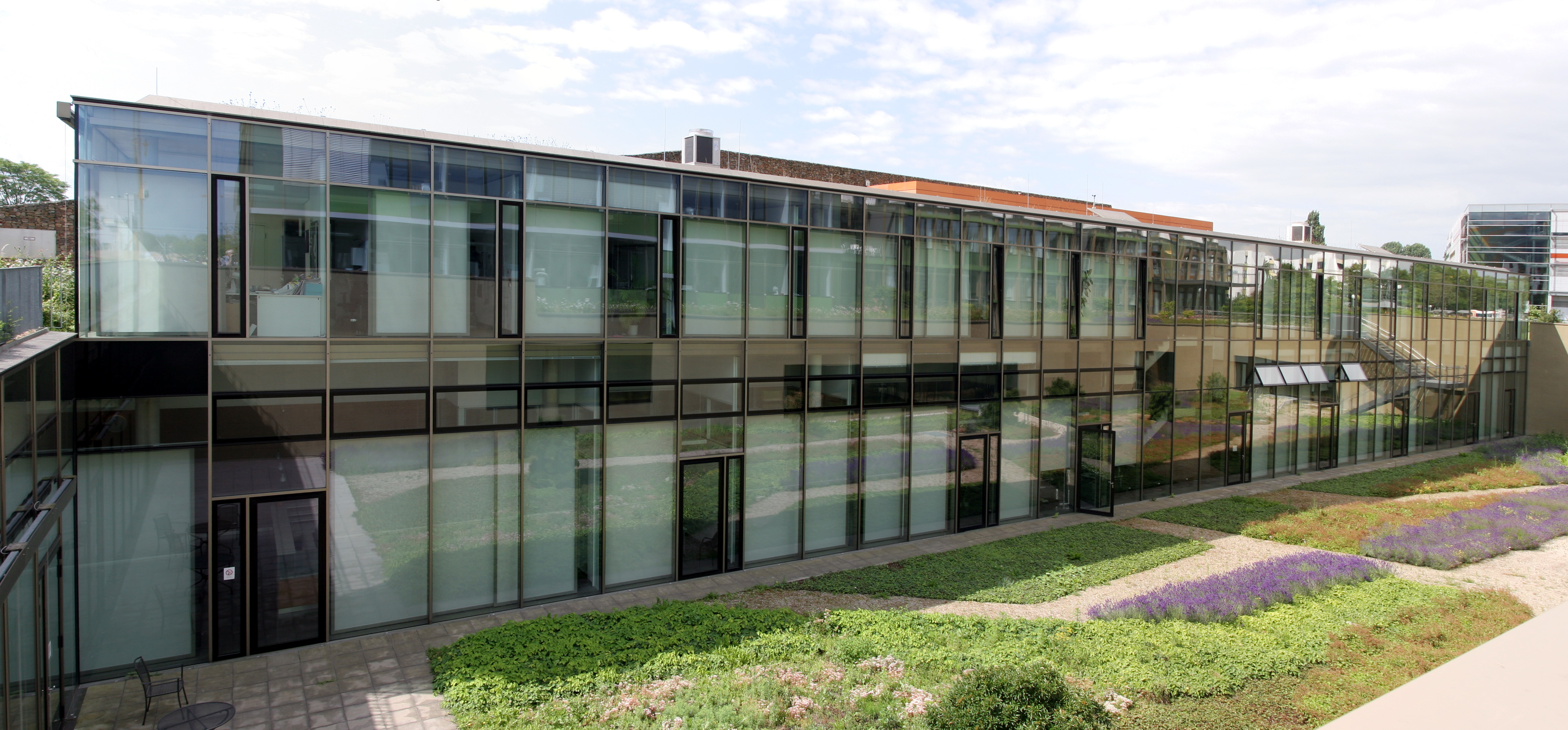
The Heidelberg Ion Beam Therapy Center, Heidelberg, Germany

Carbon ion therapy (C-ion RT) was pioneered at the National Institute of Radiological Sciences (NIRS) in Chiba, Japan, which began treating patients with carbon ion beams in 1994. This facility was the first to utilize carbon ions clinically, marking a significant advancement in particle therapy for cancer treatment. The therapeutic advantages of carbon ions were recognized earlier, but NIRS was instrumental in establishing its clinical application.

In Europe, the GSI Helmholtz Centre for Heavy Ion Research in Darmstadt, Germany, independently developed and demonstrated carbon-ion therapy, treating about 440 patients on its premises between 1997 and 2008 and transferring the technology to the Heidelberg Ion-Beam Therapy Center (HIT) in Heidelberg, Europe’s first ion-beam therapy centre.

C-ion RT uses particles more massive than protons or neutrons. Carbon ion radiotherapy has increasingly garnered scientific attention as technological delivery options have improved and clinical studies have demonstrated its treatment advantages for many cancers such as prostate, head and neck, lung, and liver cancers, bone and soft tissue sarcomas, locally recurrent rectal cancer, and pancreatic cancer, including locally advanced disease. It also has clear advantages to treat otherwise intractable hypoxic and radio-resistant cancers while opening the door for substantially hypo-fractionated treatment of normal and radio-sensitive disease.

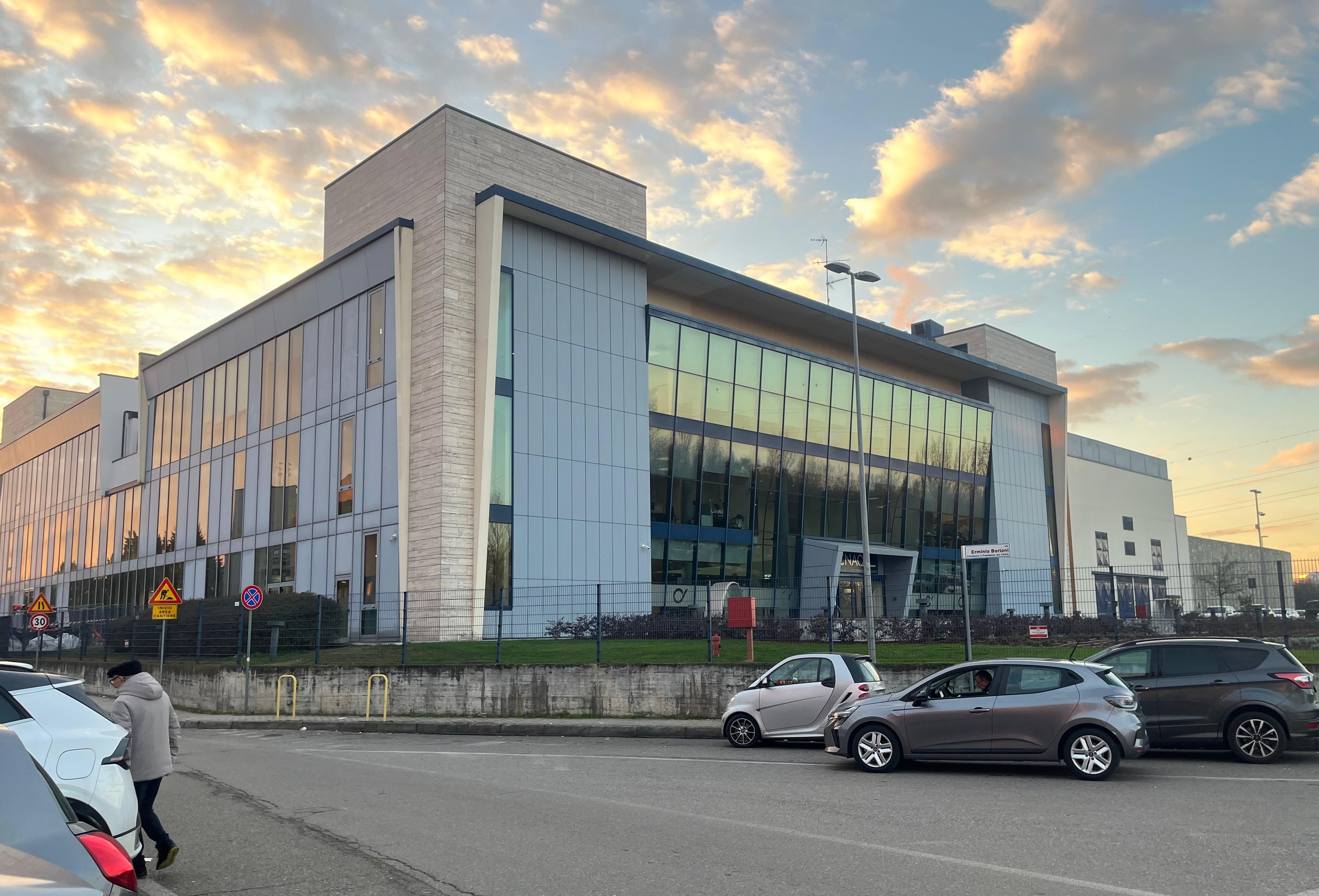
CNAO (Centro Nazionale di Adroterapia Oncologica) hadrontherapy centre in Pavia, Italy

By mid 2017, more than 15,000 patients have been treated worldwide in over 8 operational centers. Japan has been a conspicuous leader in this field. There are six heavy-ion radiotherapy facilities in operation and plans exist to construct several more facilities in the near future. In Germany this type of treatment is available at the Heidelberg Ion-Beam Therapy Center (HIT) and at the Marburg Ion-Beam Therapy Center (MIT). In Italy the National Centre of Oncological Hadrontherapy (CNAO) provides this treatment, whose design was later implemented to MedAustron centre in Wiener Neustadt, Austria. In China, the Shanghai Proton and Heavy Ion Center (SPHIC) opened for treatments in 2015 , with centers in South Korea and Taiwan soon to open. No CIRT facility now operates in the United States but several are in various states of development. At Mayo Clinic in Jacksonville, Florida, the first carbon ion radiotherapy in North America is planned to begin in 2028.

== Biological advantages of heavy-ion radiotherapy ==
From a radiation biology standpoint, there is considerable rationale to support use of heavy-ion beams in treating cancer patients. All proton and other heavy ion beam therapies exhibit a defined Bragg peak in the body so they deliver their maximum lethal dosage at or near the tumor. This minimizes harmful radiation to the surrounding normal tissues. However, carbon-ions are heavier than protons and so provide a higher relative biological effectiveness (RBE), which increases with depth to reach the maximum at the end of the beam's range. Thus the RBE of a carbon ion beam increases as the ions advance deeper into the tumor-lying region. CIRT provides the highest linear energy transfer (LET) of any currently available form of clinical radiation. This high energy delivery to the tumor results in many double-strand DNA breaks which are very difficult for the tumor to repair. Conventional radiation produces principally single strand DNA breaks which can allow many of the tumor cells to survive. The higher outright cell mortality produced by CIRT may also provide a clearer antigen signature to stimulate the patient's immune system.

== Particle therapy of moving targets ==
The precision of particle therapy of tumors situated in thorax and abdominal region is strongly affected by the target motion. The mitigation of its negative influence requires advanced techniques of tumor position monitoring (e.g., fluoroscopic imaging of implanted radio-opaque fiducial markers or electromagnetic detection of inserted transponders) and irradiation (gating, rescanning, gated rescanning and tumor tracking).
