= John Madsen =

John Madsen may refer to:

- John Madsen (American football) (born 1983), American football player
- John Madsen (footballer) (born 1937), Danish association football player
- John Madsen (physicist) (1879–1969), Australian academic, physicist, engineer and mathematician
- John M. Madsen (born 1939), American leader in The Church of Jesus Christ of Latter-day Saints

== See also ==
- Jon Madsen (born 1980), American MMA fighter
