= Proton therapy =

Medical procedure

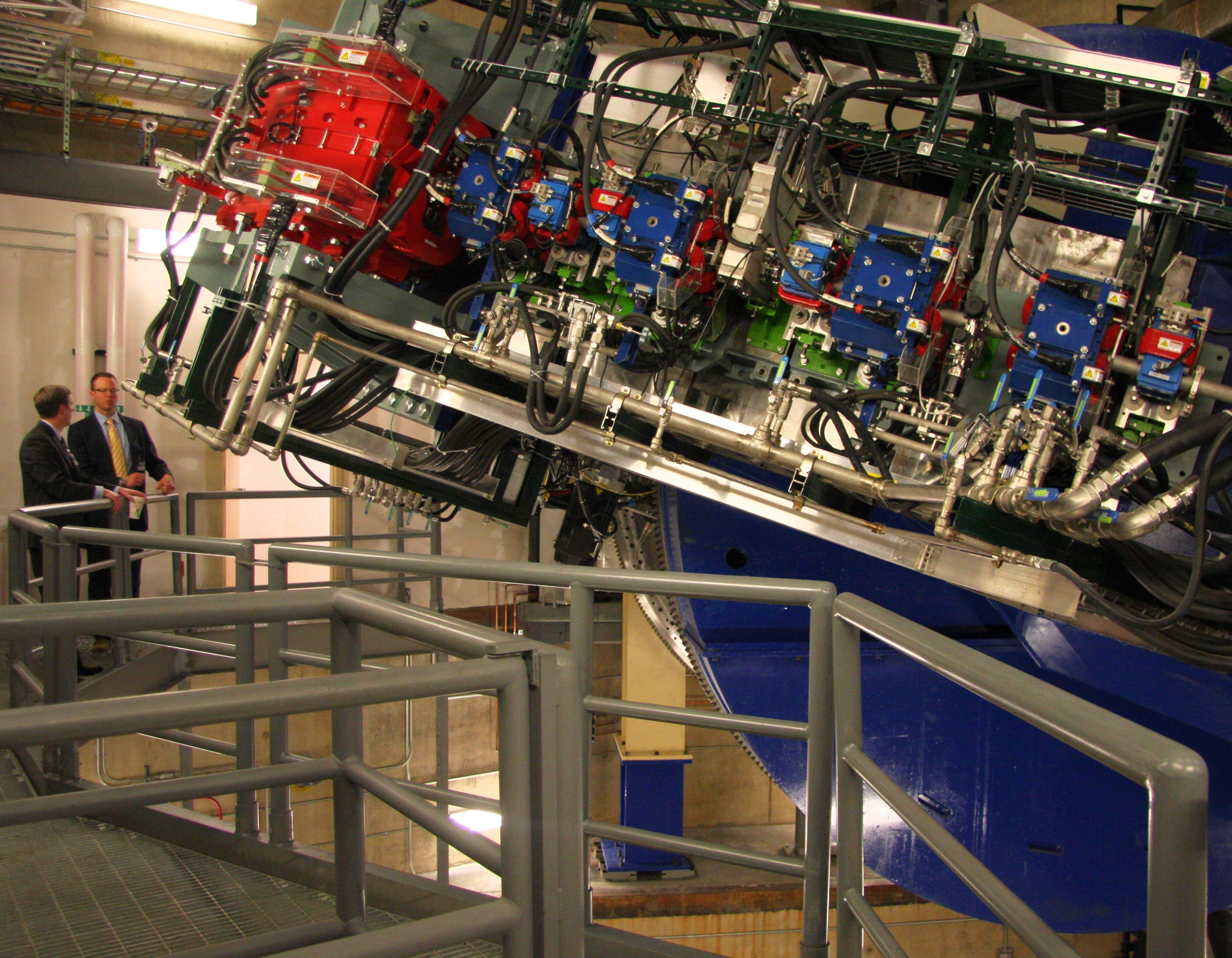
- Proton therapy equipment at the Mayo Clinic in Rochester, Minnesota
- Other names: Proton beam therapy
- ICD-10-PCS: Z92.3

In medicine, proton therapy, or proton radiotherapy, is a type of particle therapy that uses a beam of protons to irradiate diseased tissue, most often to treat cancer. Its chief advantage over other types of external beam radiotherapy is that the dose of protons is deposited over a narrow range of depth; hence in minimal entry, exit, or scattered radiation dose to healthy nearby tissues.

When evaluating whether to treat a tumor with photon or proton therapy, physicians may choose proton therapy if it is important to deliver a higher radiation dose to targeted tissues while significantly decreasing radiation to nearby organs at risk. The American Society for Radiation Oncology Model Policy for Proton Beam therapy says proton therapy is considered reasonable if sparing the surrounding normal tissue "cannot be adequately achieved with photon-based radiotherapy" and can benefit the patient. Like photon radiation therapy, proton therapy is often used in conjunction with surgery and/or chemotherapy to most effectively treat cancer.

== Description ==
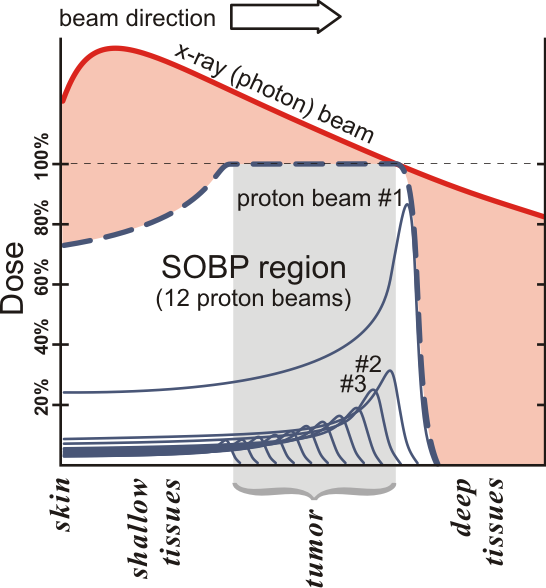
In a typical treatment plan for proton therapy, the spread out Bragg peak (SOBP, dashed blue line) shows how the radiation is distributed. The SOBP is the sum of several individual Bragg peaks (thin blue lines) at staggered depths. Note that the vast majority of the proton radiation is delivered to the tumor, not to the skin and shallow tissues in front of the tumor or to the deep tissues behind the tumor. The red line shows the depth-dose plot of an X-ray beam (photon or conventional radiation therapy) for comparison. The pink area represents additional doses of X-ray radiotherapy in front and behind the tumor – which can damage normal tissues and cause secondary cancers, especially of the skin.

Proton therapy is a type of external beam radiotherapy that uses ionizing radiation. In proton therapy, medical personnel use a particle accelerator to target a tumor with a beam of protons. These charged particles damage the DNA of cells, ultimately killing them by stopping their reproduction and thus eliminating the tumor. Cancerous cells are particularly vulnerable to attacks on DNA because of their high rate of division and their limited ability to repair DNA damage. Some cancers with specific defects in DNA repair may be more sensitive to proton radiation.

Proton therapy lets physicians deliver a highly conformal beam, i.e. delivering radiation that conforms to the shape and depth of the tumor and sparing much of the surrounding, normal tissue. For example, when comparing proton therapy to the most advanced types of photon therapy—intensity-modulated radiotherapy (IMRT) and volumetric modulated arc therapy (VMAT)—proton therapy can give similar or higher radiation doses to the tumor with a 50%-60% lower total body radiation dose.

Protons can focus energy delivery to fit the tumor shape, delivering only low-dose radiation to surrounding tissue. As a result, the patient has fewer side effects. All protons of a given energy have a certain penetration range; very few protons penetrate beyond that distance. Also, the dose delivered to tissue is maximized only over the last few millimeters of the particle's range; this maximum is called the spread out Bragg peak, often called the SOBP (see visual).

To treat tumors at greater depth, one needs a beam with higher energy, typically given in MeV (mega electron volts). Accelerators used for proton therapy typically produce protons with energies of 70 to 250 MeV. Adjusting proton energy during the treatment maximizes the cell damage within the tumor. Tissue closer to the surface of the body than the tumor gets less radiation, and thus less damage. Tissues deeper in the body get very few protons, so the dose becomes immeasurably small.

In most treatments, protons of different energies with Bragg peaks at different depths are applied to treat the entire tumor. These Bragg peaks are shown as thin blue lines in the figure in this section. While tissues behind (or deeper than) the tumor get almost no radiation, the tissues in front of (shallower than) the tumor get radiation dosage based on the SOBP.

=== Equipment ===
Most installed proton therapy systems use isochronous cyclotrons. Cyclotrons are considered simple to operate, reliable and can be made compact, especially with use of superconducting magnets. Synchrotrons can also be used, with the advantage of easier production at varying energies. Linear accelerators, as used for photon radiation therapy, are becoming commercially available as limitations of size and cost are resolved. Modern proton systems incorporate high-quality imaging for daily assessment of tumor contours, treatment planning software illustrating 3D dose distributions, and various system configurations, e.g. multiple treatment rooms connected to one accelerator. Partly because of these advances in technology, and partly because of the continually increasing amount of proton clinical data, the number of hospitals offering proton therapy continues to grow.

=== FLASH therapy ===
FLASH radiotherapy is a technique under development for photon and proton treatments, using very high dose rates (necessitating large beam currents). If applied clinically, it could shorten treatment time to just one to three 1-second sessions, and further reducing side effects.

== History ==
The first suggestion that energetic protons could be an effective treatment was made by Robert R. Wilson in a paper published in 1946 while he was involved in the design of the Harvard Cyclotron Laboratory (HCL). The first treatments were performed with particle accelerators built for physics research, notably Berkeley Radiation Laboratory in 1954 and at Uppsala in Sweden in 1957. In 1961, a collaboration began between HCL and Massachusetts General Hospital (MGH) to pursue proton therapy. Over the next 41 years, this program refined and expanded these techniques while treating 9,116 patients before the cyclotron was shut down in 2002. In the USSR a therapeutic proton beam with energies up to 200 MeV was obtained at the synchrocyclotron of JINR in Dubna in 1967. The ITEP center in Moscow, Russia, which began treating patients in 1969, is the oldest proton center still in operation. The Paul Scherrer Institute in Switzerland was the world's first proton center to treat eye tumors beginning in 1984. In addition, they invented pencil beam scanning in 1996, which became the state-of-the art form of proton therapy.

The world's first hospital-based proton therapy center was a low energy cyclotron centre for eye tumors at Clatterbridge Cancer Centre in the UK, opened in 1989, followed in 1990 at the Loma Linda University Medical Center (LLUMC) in Loma Linda, California. Later, the Northeast Proton Therapy Center at Massachusetts General Hospital was brought online, and the HCL treatment program was transferred to it in 2001 and 2002. At the beginning of 2023, there were 41 proton therapy centers in the United States, and a total of 89 worldwide. As of 2020, six manufacturers make proton therapy systems: Hitachi, Ion Beam Applications, Mevion Medical Systems, ProNova Solutions, and Varian Medical Systems.

== Types ==
The newest form of proton therapy, pencil beam scanning, gives therapy by sweeping a proton beam laterally over the target so that it gives the required dose while closely conforming to shape of the targeted tumor. Before the use of pencil beam scanning, oncologists used a scattering method to direct a wide beam toward the tumor.

=== Passive scattering beam delivery ===
The first commercially available proton delivery systems used a scattering process, or passive scattering, to deliver the therapy. With scattering proton therapy the proton beam is spread out by scattering devices, and the beam is then shaped by putting items such as collimators and compensators in the path of the protons. The collimators were custom made for the patient with milling machines. Passive scattering gives homogeneous dose along the target volume. Therefore, passive scattering gives more limited control over dose distributions proximal to target. Over time many scattering therapy systems have been upgraded to deliver pencil beam scanning. Because scattering therapy was the first type of proton therapy available, most clinical data available on proton therapy—especially long-term data as of 2020—were acquired via scattering technology.

=== Pencil beam scanning beam delivery ===
A newer and more flexible delivery method is pencil beam scanning, using a beam that sweeps laterally over the target so that it delivers the needed dose while closely conforming to the tumor's shape. This conformal delivery is achieved by shaping the dose through magnetic scanning of thin beamlets of protons without needing apertures and compensators. Multiple beams are delivered from different directions, and magnets in the treatment nozzle steer the proton beam to conform to the target volume layer as the dose is painted layer by layer. This type of scanning delivery provides greater flexibility and control, letting the proton dose conform more precisely to the shape of the tumor.

Delivery of protons via pencil beam scanning, in use since 1996 at the Paul Scherrer Institute, allows for the most precise type of proton delivery: intensity-modulated proton therapy (IMPT). IMPT is to proton therapy what IMRT is to conventional photon therapy—treatment that more closely conforms to the tumor while avoiding surrounding structures. Virtually all new proton systems provide pencil beam scanning exclusively. A study led by Memorial Sloan Kettering Cancer Center suggests that IMPT can improve local control when compared to passive scattering for patients with nasal cavity and paranasal sinus malignancies.

== Application ==
It was estimated that by the end of 2019, a total of ≈200,000 patients had been treated with proton therapy. Physicians use protons to treat conditions in two broad categories:

- Disease sites that respond well to higher doses of radiation, i.e., dose escalation. Dose escalation has sometimes shown a higher probability of "cure" (i.e. local control) than conventional radiotherapy. These include, among others, uveal melanoma (ocular tumor), skull base and paraspinal tumor (chondrosarcoma and chordoma), and unresectable sarcoma. In all these cases proton therapy gives significant improvement in the probability of local control, over conventional radiotherapy. For eye tumors, proton therapy also has high rates of maintaining the natural eye.
- Treatment where proton therapy's increased precision reduces unwanted side effects by lessening the dose to normal tissue. In these cases, the tumor dose is the same as in conventional therapy, so there is no expectation of increased probability of curing the disease. Instead, emphasis is on reducing the dose to normal tissue, thus reducing unwanted effects.

Two prominent examples are pediatric neoplasms (such as medulloblastoma) and prostate cancer.

=== Pediatric ===
Irreversible long-term side effects of conventional radiation therapy for pediatric cancers are well documented and include growth disorders, neurocognitive toxicity, ototoxicity with subsequent effects on learning and language development, and renal, endocrine and gonadal dysfunctions. Radiation-induced secondary malignancy is another very serious adverse effect that has been reported. As there is minimal exit dose when using proton radiation therapy, dose to surrounding normal tissues can be significantly limited, reducing the acute toxicity which positively impacts the risk for these long-term side effects. Cancers requiring craniospinal irradiation, for example, benefit from the absence of exit dose with proton therapy: dose to the heart, mediastinum, bowel, bladder and other tissues anterior to the vertebrae is eliminated, hence a reduction of acute thoracic, gastrointestinal and bladder side effects.

=== Eye tumor ===
Proton therapy for eye tumors is a special case since this treatment requires only relatively low energy protons (≈70 MeV). Owing to this low energy, some particle therapy centers only treat eye tumors. Proton, or more generally, hadron therapy of tissue close to the eye affords sophisticated methods to assess the alignment of the eye that can vary significantly from other patient position verification approaches in image guided particle therapy. Position verification and correction must ensure that the radiation spares sensitive tissue like the optic nerve to preserve the patient's vision.

For ocular tumors, selecting the type of radiotherapy depends on tumor location and extent, tumor radioresistance (calculating the dose needed to eliminate the tumor), and the therapy's potential toxic side effects on nearby critical structures. For example, proton therapy is an option for retinoblastoma and intraocular melanoma. The advantage of a proton beam is that it has the potential to effectively treat the tumor while sparing sensitive structures of the eye. Given its effectiveness, proton therapy has been described as the "gold standard" treatment for ocular melanoma. The implementation of momentum cooling technique in proton therapy for eye treatment can significantly enhance its effectiveness. This technique aids in reducing the radiation dose administered to healthy organs while ensuring that the treatment is completed within a few seconds. Consequently, patients experience improved comfort during the procedure.

=== Base of skull cancer ===
When receiving radiation for skull base tumors, side effects of the radiation can include pituitary hormone dysfunction and visual field deficit—after radiation for pituitary tumors—as well as cranial neuropathy (nerve damage), radiation-induced osteosarcoma (bone cancer), and osteoradionecrosis, which occurs when radiation causes part of the bone in the jaw or skull base to die. Proton therapy has been very effective for people with base of skull tumors. Unlike conventional photon radiation, protons do not penetrate beyond the tumor. Proton therapy lowers the risk of treatment-related side effects from when healthy tissue gets radiation. Clinical studies have found proton therapy to be effective for skull base tumors.

=== Head and neck tumor ===
Proton particles do not deposit exit dose, so proton therapy can spare normal tissues far from the tumor. This is particularly useful for head and neck tumors because of the anatomic constraints found in nearly all cancers in this region. The dosimetric advantage unique to proton therapy translates into toxicity reduction. For recurrent head and neck cancer requiring reirradiation, proton therapy is able to maximize a focused dose of radiation to the tumor while minimizing dose to surrounding tissues, hence a minimal acute toxicity profile, even in patients who got multiple prior courses of radiotherapy.

=== Left-side breast cancer ===
When breast cancer — especially in the left breast — is treated with conventional radiation, the lung and heart, which are near the left breast, are particularly susceptible to photon radiation damage. Such damage can eventually cause lung problems (e.g. lung cancer) or various heart problems. Depending on location of the tumor, damage can also occur to the esophagus, or to the chest wall (which can potentially lead to leukemia). One recent study showed that proton therapy has low toxicity to nearby healthy tissues and similar rates of disease control compared with conventional radiation. Other researchers found that proton pencil beam scanning techniques can reduce the mean heart dose while maintaining a higher dose to irradiated lymph nodes.

Small studies have found that, compared to conventional photon radiation, proton therapy delivers minimal toxic dose to healthy tissues and specifically decreased dose to the heart and lung. Large-scale trials are underway to examine other potential benefits of proton therapy to treat breast cancer.

=== Lymphoma ===
Though chemotherapy is the main treatment for lymphoma, consolidative radiation is often used in Hodgkin lymphoma and aggressive non-Hodgkin lymphoma, while definitive treatment with radiation alone is used in a small fraction of lymphoma patients. Unfortunately, treatment-related toxicities caused by chemotherapy agents and radiation exposure to healthy tissues are major concerns for lymphoma survivors. Advanced radiation therapy technologies such as proton therapy may offer significant and clinically relevant advantages such as sparing important organs at risk and decreasing the risk for late normal tissue damage while still achieving the primary goal of disease control. This is especially important for lymphoma patients who are being treated with curative intent and have long life expectancy following therapy.

=== Prostate cancer ===
In prostate cancer cases, the issue is less clear. Some published studies found a reduction in long term rectal and genito-urinary damage when treating with protons rather than photons (meaning X-ray or gamma ray therapy). Others showed a small difference, limited to cases where the prostate is particularly close to certain anatomical structures. The relatively small improvement found may be the result of inconsistent patient set-up and internal organ movement during treatment, which offsets most of the advantage of increased precision. One source suggests that dose errors around 20% can result from motion errors of just 2.5 mm (0.098 in). and another that prostate motion is between 5–10 mm (0.20–0.39 in).

The number of cases of prostate cancer diagnosed each year far exceeds those of the other diseases referred to above, and this has led some, but not all, facilities to devote most of their treatment slots to prostate treatments. For example, two hospital facilities devote ≈65% and 50% of their proton treatment capacity to prostate cancer, while a third devotes only 7.1%.

Worldwide numbers are hard to compile, but one example says that in 2003 ≈26% of proton therapy treatments worldwide were for prostate cancer.

=== Gastrointestinal malignancy ===
A growing amount of data shows that proton therapy has great potential to increase therapeutic tolerance for patients with GI malignancy. The possibility of decreasing radiation dose to organs at risk may also help facilitate chemotherapy dose escalation or allow new chemotherapy combinations. Proton therapy will play a decisive role for ongoing intensified combined modality treatments for GI cancers. The following review presents the benefits of proton therapy in treating hepatocellular carcinoma, pancreatic cancer and esophageal cancer.

=== Hepatocellular carcinoma ===
Post-treatment liver decompensation, and subsequent liver failure, is a risk with radiotherapy for hepatocellular carcinoma, the most common type of primary liver cancer. Research shows that proton therapy gives favorable results related to local tumor control, progression-free survival, and overall survival. Other studies, which examine proton therapy compared with conventional photon therapy, show that proton therapy gives improved survival and/or fewer side effects; hence proton therapy could significantly improve clinical outcomes for some patients with liver cancer.

=== Reirradiation for recurrent cancer ===
For patients who get local or regional recurrences after their initial radiation therapy, physicians are limited in their treatment options due to their reluctance to give additional photon radiation therapy to tissues that have already been irradiated. Re-irradiation is a potentially curative treatment option for patients with locally recurrent head and neck cancer. In particular, pencil beam scanning may be ideally suited for reirradiation. Research shows the feasibility of using proton therapy with acceptable side effects, even in patients who have had multiple prior courses of photon radiation.

== Comparison with other treatments ==
A large study on comparative effectiveness of proton therapy was published by teams of the University of Pennsylvania and Washington University in St. Louis in JAMA Oncology, assessing if proton therapy in the setting of concurrent chemoradiotherapy is associated with fewer 90-day unplanned hospitalizations and overall survival compared with concurrent photon therapy and chemoradiotherapy. The study included 1483 adult patients with nonmetastatic, locally advanced cancer treated with concurrent chemoradiotherapy with curative intent and concluded, "proton chemoradiotherapy was associated with significantly reduced acute adverse events that caused unplanned hospitalizations, with similar disease-free and overall survival". A significant number of randomized controlled trials is recruiting, but only a limited number have been completed as of August 2020. A phase III randomized controlled trial of proton beam therapy versus radiofrequency ablation (RFA) for recurrent hepatocellular carcinoma organized by the National Cancer Center in Korea showed better 2-year local progression-free survival for the proton arm and concluded that proton beam therapy (PBT) is "not inferior to RFA in terms of local progression-free survival and safety, denoting that either RFA or PBT can be applied to recurrent small HCC patients". A phase IIB randomized controlled trial of proton beam therapy versus IMRT for locally advanced esophageal cancer organized by University of Texas MD Anderson Cancer Center concluded that proton beam therapy reduced the risk and severity of adverse events compared with IMRT while maintaining similar progression free survival. Another Phase II randomized controlled trial comparing photons versus protons for Glioblastoma concluded that patients at risk of severe lymphopenia could benefit from proton therapy. A team from Stanford University assessed the risk of secondary cancer after primary cancer treatment with external beam radiation using data from the National Cancer Database for nine tumor types: head and neck, gastrointestinal, gynecologic, lymphoma, lung, prostate, breast, bone/soft tissue, and brain/central nervous system. The study included a total of 450,373 patients and concluded that proton therapy was associated with a lower risk of second cancer.

The issue of when, whether, and how best to apply this technology is still under discussion by physicians and researchers. One recently introduced method, 'model-based selection', uses comparative treatment plans for IMRT and IMPT in combination with normal tissue complication probability (NTCP) models to identify patients who may benefit most from proton therapy.

Clinical trials are underway to examine the comparative efficacy of proton therapy (vs photon radiation) for the following:

- Pediatric cancers—by St. Jude Children's Research Hospital, Samsung Medical Center
- Base of skull cancer—by Heidelberg University
- Head and neck cancer—by MD Anderson, Memorial Sloan Kettering and other centers
- Brain and spinal cord cancer—by Massachusetts General Hospital, Uppsala University and other centers, NRG Oncology
- Hepatocellular carcinoma (liver)—by NRG Oncology, Chang Gung Memorial Hospital, Loma Linda University
- Lung cancer—by Radiation Therapy Oncology Group (RTOG), Proton Collaborative Group (PCG), Mayo Clinic
- Esophageal cancer—by NRG Oncology, Abramson Cancer Center, University of Pennsylvania
- Breast cancer—by University of Pennsylvania, Proton Collaborative Group (PCG)
- Pancreatic cancer—by University of Maryland, Proton Collaborative Group (PCG)

=== X-ray radiotherapy ===
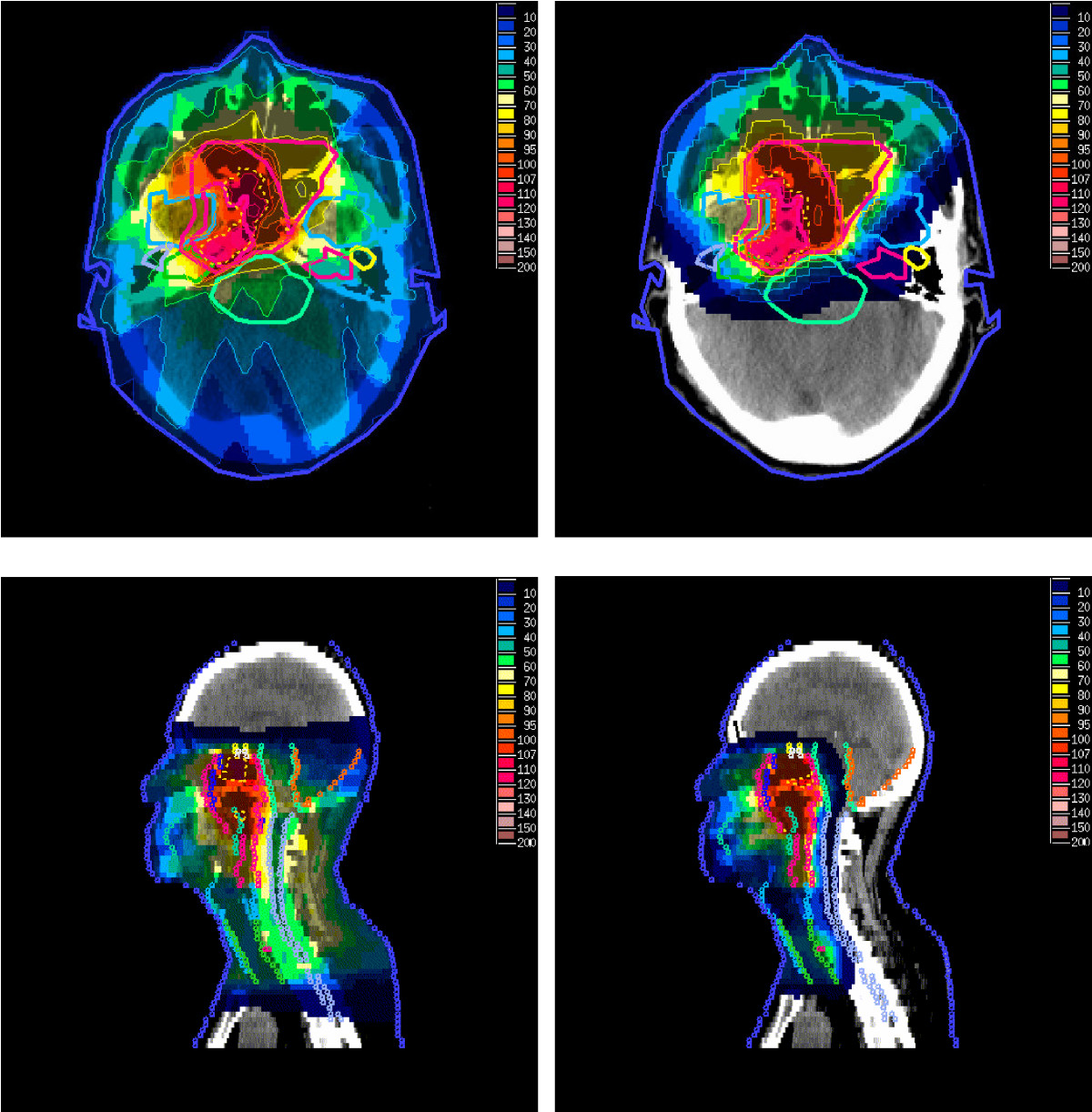
Irradiation of nasopharyngeal carcinoma by photon (X-ray) therapy (left) and proton therapy (right)

The figure at the right of the page shows how beams of X-rays (IMRT; left frame) and beams of protons (right frame), of different energies, penetrate human tissue. A tumor with a sizable thickness is covered by the IMRT spread out Bragg peak (SOBP) shown as the red lined distribution in the figure. The SOBP is an overlap of several pristine Bragg peaks (blue lines) at staggered depths.

Megavoltage X-ray therapy has less "skin sparing potential" than proton therapy: X-ray radiation at the skin, and at very small depths, is lower than for proton therapy. One study estimates that passively scattered proton fields have a slightly higher entrance dose at the skin (≈75%) compared to therapeutic megavoltage (MeV) photon beams (≈60%). X-ray radiation dose falls off gradually, needlessly harming tissue deeper in the body and damaging the skin and surface tissue opposite the beam entrance. The differences between the two methods depends on:

- Width of the SOBP
- Depth of the tumor
- Number of beams that treat the tumor

The X-ray advantage of less harm to skin at the entrance is partially counteracted by harm to skin at exit point.

Since X-ray treatments are usually done with multiple exposures from opposite sides, each section of skin is exposed to both entering and exiting X-rays. In proton therapy, skin exposure at the entrance point is higher, but tissues on the opposite side of the body to the tumor get no radiation. Thus, X-ray therapy causes slightly less damage to skin and surface tissues, and proton therapy causes less damage to deeper tissues in front of and beyond the target.

An important consideration in comparing these treatments is whether the equipment delivers protons via the scattering method (historically, the most common) or a spot scanning method. Spot scanning can adjust the width of the SOBP on a spot-by-spot basis, which reduces the volume of normal (healthy) tissue inside the high dose region. Also, spot scanning allows for intensity modulated proton therapy (IMPT), which determines individual spot intensities using an optimization algorithm that lets the user balance the competing goals of irradiating tumors while sparing normal tissue. Spot scanning availability depends on the machine and the institution. Spot scanning is more commonly known as pencil-beam scanning and is available on IBA, Hitachi, Mevion (known as HYPERSCAN which became US FDA approved in 2017) and Varian.

=== Surgery ===
Physicians base the decision to use surgery or proton therapy (or any radiation therapy) on tumor type, stage, and location. Sometimes surgery is superior (such as cutaneous melanoma), sometimes radiation is superior (such as skull base chondrosarcoma), and sometimes are comparable (for example, prostate cancer). Sometimes, they are used together (e.g., rectal cancer or early stage breast cancer).

The benefit of external beam proton radiation is in the dosimetric difference from external beam X-ray radiation and brachytherapy in cases where use of radiation therapy is already indicated, rather than as a direct competition with surgery. In prostate cancer, the most common indication for proton beam therapy, no clinical study directly comparing proton therapy to surgery, brachytherapy, or other treatments has shown any clinical benefit for proton beam therapy. Indeed, the largest study to date showed that IMRT compared with proton therapy was associated with less gastrointestinal morbidity.

== Side effects and risks ==
Proton therapy is a type of external beam radiotherapy, and shares risks and side effects of other forms of radiation therapy. The dose outside of the treatment region can be significantly less for deep-tissue tumors than X-ray therapy, because proton therapy takes full advantage of the Bragg peak. Proton therapy has been in use for over 40 years, and is a mature technology. As with all medical knowledge, understanding of the interaction of radiations with tumor and normal tissue is still imperfect.

== Costs ==
Historically, proton therapy has been expensive. An analysis published in 2003 found that the cost of proton therapy is ≈2.4 times that of X-ray therapies. Newer, less expensive, and dozens more proton treatment centers are driving costs down and they offer more accurate three-dimensional targeting. Higher proton dosage over fewer treatments sessions (1/3 fewer or less) is also driving costs down. Thus the cost is expected to reduce as better proton technology becomes more widely available. An analysis published in 2005 determined that the cost of proton therapy is not unrealistic and should not be the reason for denying patients access to the technology. In some clinical situations, proton beam therapy is clearly superior to the alternatives.

A study in 2007 expressed concerns about the effectiveness of proton therapy for prostate cancer, but with the advent of new developments in the technology, such as improved scanning techniques and more precise dose delivery ('pencil beam scanning'), this situation may change considerably. Amitabh Chandra, a health economist at Harvard University, said, "Proton-beam therapy is like the Death Star of American medical technology... It's a metaphor for all the problems we have in American medicine." Proton therapy is cost-effective for some types of cancer, but not all. In particular, some other treatments offer better overall value for treatment of prostate cancer.

As of 2018, the cost of a single-room particle therapy system is US$40 million, with multi-room systems costing up to US$200 million.

== Treatment centers ==
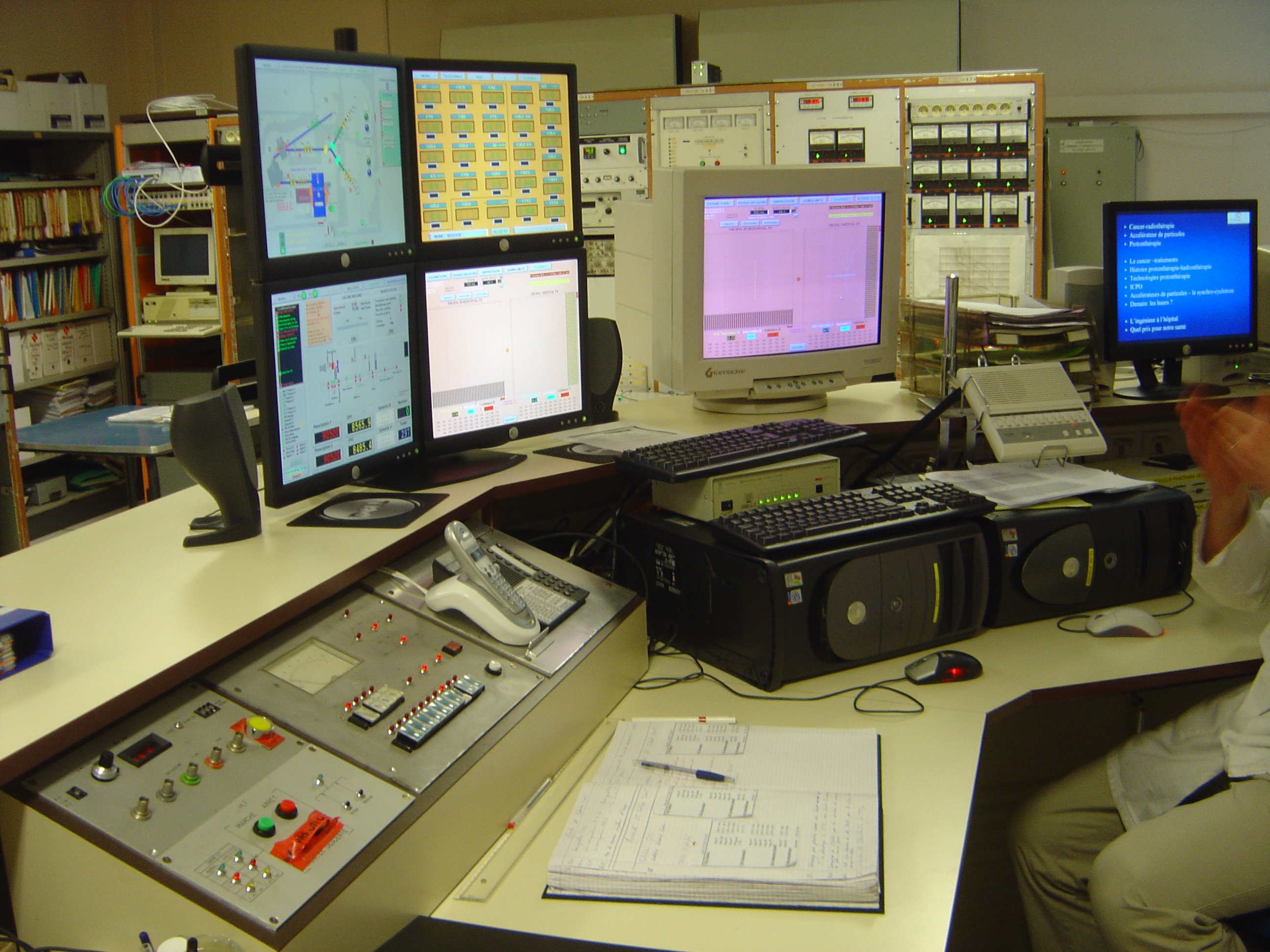
Control panel of the synchrocyclotron at the Orsay proton therapy center, France

As of August 2020, there are over 89 particle therapy facilities worldwide, with at least 41 others under construction. As of August 2020, there are 34 operational proton therapy centers in the United States. As of the end of 2015 more than 154,203 patients had been treated worldwide.

One hindrance to universal use of the proton in cancer treatment is the size and cost of the cyclotron or synchrotron equipment necessary. Several industrial teams are working on development of comparatively small accelerator systems to deliver the proton therapy to patients. Among the technologies being investigated are superconducting synchrocyclotrons (also known as FM Cyclotrons), ultra-compact synchrotrons, dielectric wall accelerators, and linear particle accelerators.

== See also ==
- Particle therapy
- Charged particle therapy
- Hadron
- Microbeam
- Fast neutron therapy
- Boron neutron capture therapy
- Linear energy transfer
- Electromagnetic radiation and health
- Dosimetry
- Ionizing radiation
- List of oncology-related terms
