= MedAustron =

Austrian center for cancer treatment

Coordinates: 47°50′12.5″N 16°15′18.4″E

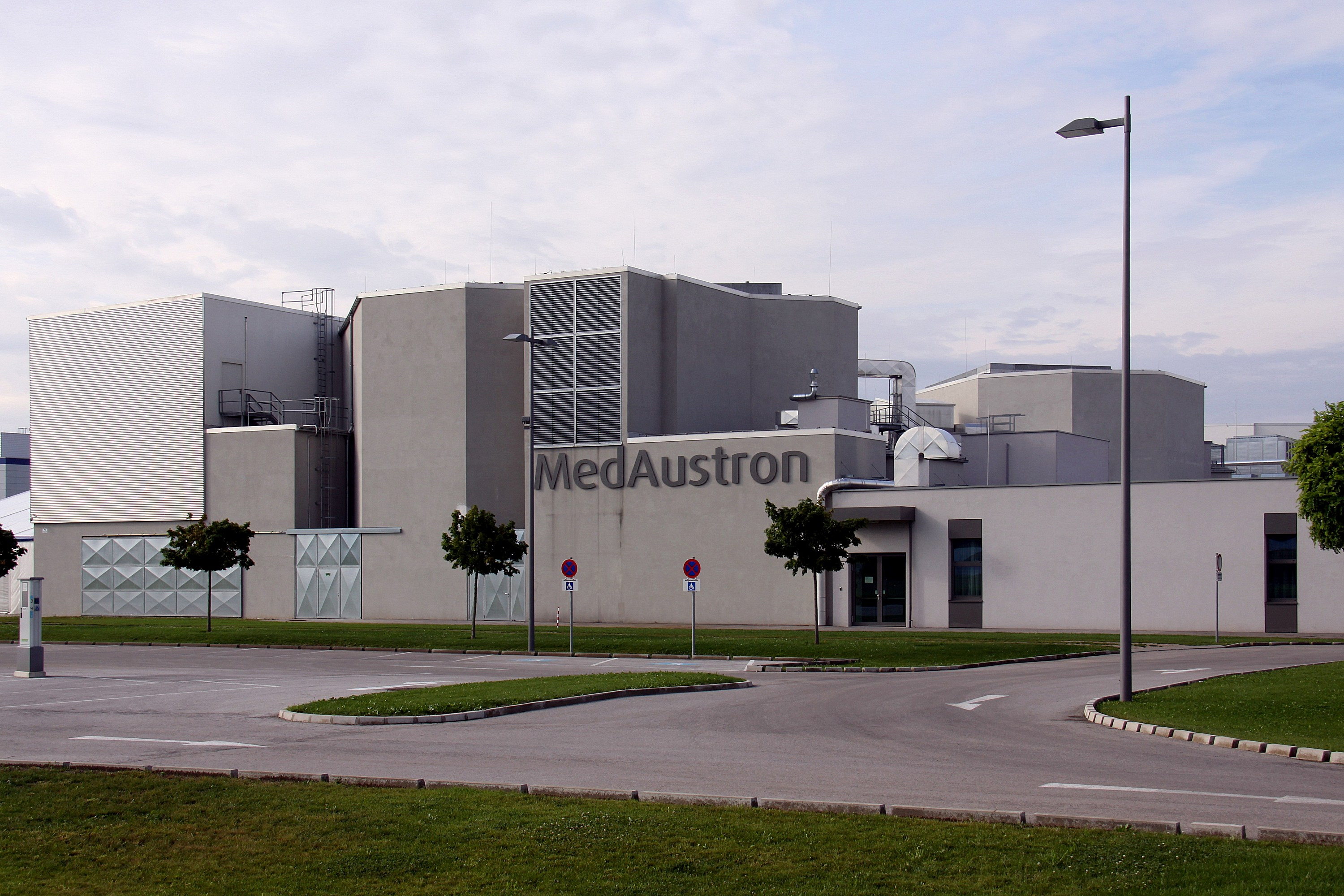
- MedAustron facility in Wiener Neustadt
- Trade name: MedAustron
- Native name: MedAustron
- Romanized name: MedAustron
- Formerly: EBG MedAustron GmbH
- Company type: GmbH
- Industry: Medical Technologies & Laboratory Equipment
- Founded: January 1, 2011; 15 years ago in Wiener Neustadt, Austria
- Headquarters: Marie Curie-Strasse 5, Wiener Neustadt, Austria
- Number of locations: 1 (2025)
- Area served: Austria and international research community
- Key people: Prof. Dr. Eugen B. Hug
- Products: Ion beam therapy services
- Brands: MedAustron
- Services: Proton and carbon ion therapy, clinical trials, research
- Owner: Republic of Austria, Lower Austria, City of Wiener Neustadt
- Number of employees: ~180 (2025)
- Website: www.medaustron.at

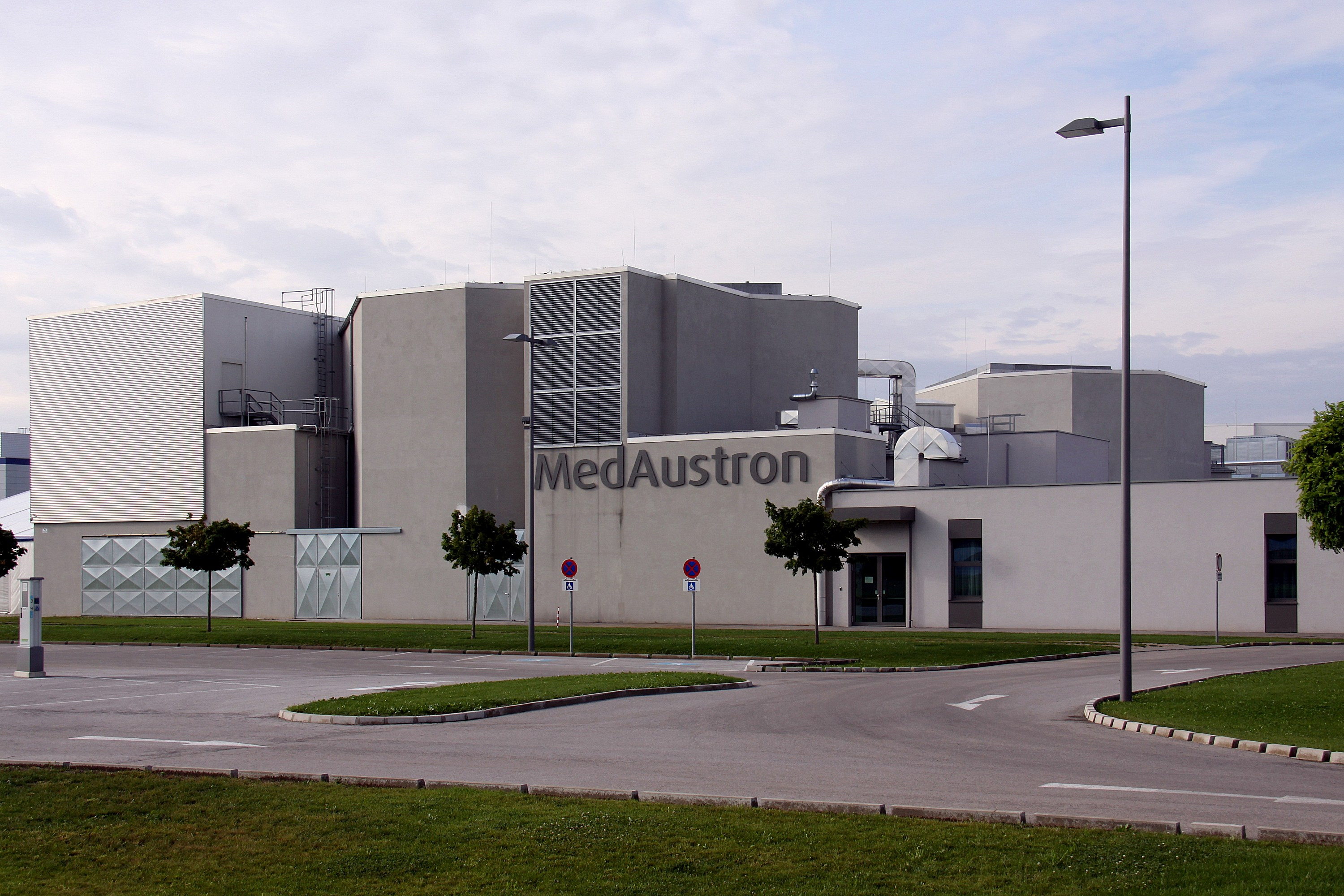
MedAustron in Wiener Neustadt (2015)

MedAustron is an interdisciplinary and supra-regional Austrian center for cancer treatment with particle therapy, research and further development of this form of therapy, and non-clinical research with protons and heavier ions.

== History ==
In the early 1990s, as part of the Austron project by an organization of the same name, there was a plan to establish a neutron spallation source as a major research facility for particle radiation in Austria. MedAustron was conceived in parallel from the late 1990s. In 1996, with the financial support of the City of Wiener Neustadt and the Province of Lower Austria, a base was created in the form of an office in the Regional Innovation Center (RIZ), where essential parts of a three-volume feasibility study were elaborated. This formed the basis of the subsequent design study, which was published in 2004.

In 2012 the building was completed and in the following year the construction of the particle accelerator and the positioning system started. In January 2013, the first ion source was inaugurated. In parallel, the project was submitted to the Court of Auditors. The technical trial operation and installation of the medical technology took place from 2014, and the medical physics commissioning in 2015.

In August 2016, the irradiation room, including the proton beam, was officially handed over to the scientific community.

On December 5, 2016, the first tumor patient was originally to have been treated. However, due to missing approvals, this date had to be postponed. On December 14, 2016, the last missing certification took place; thus, the legally binding authorization for use was granted and the first tumor patients could be treated.

In mid-2017, the second treatment room was put into operation. In July 2019, it was possible to start working with carbon ions for the first time. In 2022, Ludwig Gold succeeded Alfred Zens as managing director.

== Professorships ==
In cooperation with the Medical University of Vienna and the Vienna University of Technology, a total of three professorships were created in 2014 and 2015. These include the two professorships "Medical Radiation Physics and Oncotechnology" and "Applied and Translational Radiation Biology" at the Medical University of Vienna. At the Atomic Institute of the Vienna University of Technology, a separate professorship was established in the Radiation Physics Group.
