= Richard Kleeman =

Australian nuclear physicist

- Born: 20 January 1875; Rowland Flat, South Australia
- Died: 10 October 1932 (aged 57); New York City
- Resting place: Mount Hope Cemetery, New York
- Education: University of Adelaide; University of Cambridge
- Scientific career
- Fields: Nuclear physics
- Workplaces: Cavendish Laboratory; Union College
- Doctoral advisor: William Henry Bragg

Richard Daniel Kleeman (20 January 1875 – 10 October 1932) was an Australian physicist. With William Henry Bragg he discovered that the alpha particles emitted from particular radioactive substances always had the same energy, providing a new way of identifying and classifying them.

== Biography ==
Richard Daniel Kleeman was born in Rowland Flat, South Australia, on 20 January 1875, the oldest of the nine children of a farmer, Christoph Daniel Kleemann, and his wife Johanna Elenore née Munchenberg. He left school to work on the family farm when he was 13 years old. He 1893, he became an apprentice cooper at Yalumba. After completing his apprenticeship, he worked as a cooper at the Château Tanunda Winery until 1901.

Kleeman studied physics privately, and began sending papers to William Henry Bragg, the professor of mathematics and physics at the University of Adelaide. Bragg was sufficiently impressed to arrange for Kleeman to be admitted to the university. Kleeman was awarded his BSc degree with first class honours in physics in 1905. He then worked at the university as lecturer and demonstrator, and as an assistant to Bragg in his studies of radioactivity, then a new area of research. He published five papers with Bragg on radioactivity.

They discovered that alpha particles emitted from particular radioactive substances always had the same energy. This provided a new way of identifying and classifying radioactive substances, and ultimately yielded important clues about the structure of atoms. Bragg mailed copies of their results to Frederick Soddy, who arranged for their publication in Philosophical Magazine.

In 1908, the university awarded Kleeman his DSc degree. The following year he received a Mackinnon Research studentship from the Royal Society that allowed him to travel to the UK as a researcher at the Cavendish Laboratory at the University of Cambridge. He subsequently received a Clark Maxwell scholarship. He was able to renew his collaboration with Bragg, who was now the professor of physics at the University of Leeds, writing papers on radioactivity and gases.

While at the Cavendish Laboratory, Kleeman unsuccessfully applied for various academic appointments, and was particularly disappointed at being passed over for the inaugural professorship of mathematics and physics at the University of Western Australia. When he returned to Adelaide for a holiday in 1911, he courted Bertha Pauline Martin, and they were married at the parish church in Woburn Square in London on 11 July 1912. They had two children, one of whom died in childhood.

Kleeman's German background made securing an academic position in Australia or the UK more problematic after the outbreak of the First World War in August 1914, and in November he became an assistant professor at Union College in Schenectady, New York. He became an associate professor there in 1920. He was also a consulting physicist at General Electric from 1919 to 1927. He worked on a book, A Kinetic Theory of Gases and Liquids, which was published in 1920. In 1927, he left Union College to become an independent researcher, and studied the behaviour of substances at the absolute zero temperature.

Kleeman died from pneumonia at the NewYork–Presbyterian Hospital on 10 October 1932, and was buried in Mount Hope cemetery in New York.
