= John Madsen (physicist) =

Sir John Percival Vissing Madsen FAA (24 March 1879 – 4 October 1969) was an Australian academic, physicist, engineer, mathematician and Army officer.

This history of Madsen's activities in Australian science and engineering covers the period 1900–1956 during which applications of electricity, X-ray analysis, standardised measurements for production, radio propagation, radar and radio astronomy, nuclear physics and digital computers made tremendous progress in part due to major advances in fundamental research & also the heightened activity due to two world wars. Central to these activities largely carried out at Sydney University, was the Electrical Engineering Department & the CSIRO National Standards Laboratory/ Radiophysics Laboratory (now The Madsen Building in the University grounds.

Madsen's roles encompassed the positions of Lecturer, Assistant Professor, Professor and Emeritus Professor from 1909 up to 1956 when he finally retired as Chairman of the Radio Research Board which he founded in 1927. Until 1946 Madsen was the first and only Professor of Electrical Engineering in any Australian University.

== Early life ==
Madsen was born at Lochinvar, in the Hunter Valley, New South Wales. Madsen attended Sydney High School and was Dux of the school.

Madsen graduated from Sydney University with first class honours and University Medals in both Science and Engineering in 1900 and then 1901 when he read physics and mathematics establishing the practice of taking the double degree of BSc and BE and he himself embarking on a lifelong career of applying physics to the foundations of engineering.

Fishing at Palm Beach with a large jewfish

At Australia House London June 1941 dressed for his knighthood dubbing

== Career ==
A group photo in 1950 at Sydney University of the Australian Organising committee preparatory to the URSI conference in 1952

In 1901, Madsen was appointed lecturer in mathematics and physics at the University of Adelaide, where he came under the influence of Professor William Henry Bragg with whom he co-operated with and became a lifelong friend. In 1909, Madsen's interest in the practical application of science led him to accept a lectureship in engineering at the University of Sydney, where he became assistant professor in 1912.

In recognition of the outstanding Australian radio work done in the previous 25 years the Xth General Assembly was held at Sydney University in August 1952. Madsen was Chairman of the Australian Organising Committee and was also elected President of the Xth Assembly.

In 1956, there was great concern in the West that the Soviet Union had taken a significant lead in scientific training of its engineers following the detonation of its hydrogen bomb soviet atomic bomb project and the soon to follow Sputnik 1. To address the situation in Australia, Madsen published a paper through Sydney University setting out recommendations for manpower requirements in the scientific era touching greatly on his own experience of the previous 50 years of promoting engineering with science. In the post war period to the end of the twentieth century, there was a significant change in emerging technology policies moving from a mainly government sponsored "supply" side environment to a business orientated "demand" side market."

== Personal life ==
Madsen was the eldest of the family of four sons and two daughters of Hans Frandsen Madsen and his wife Annie (née Bush). His father, Hans Madsen, born in Denmark, migrated to Australia in 1864 and, while working as a miner, became one of the first pupils of the Ballarat School of Mines.
