= Range (particle radiation) =

In passing through matter, charged particles ionize and thus lose energy in many steps, until their energy is (almost) zero. The distance to this point is called the range of the particle. The range depends on the type of particle, on its initial energy and on the material through which it passes.

For example, if the ionising particle passing through the material is a positive ion like an alpha particle or proton, it will collide with atomic electrons in the material via Coulombic interaction. Since the mass of the proton or alpha particle is much greater than that of the electron, there will be no significant deviation from the radiation's incident path and very little kinetic energy will be lost in each collision. As such, it will take many successive collisions for such heavy ionising radiation to come to a halt within the stopping medium or material. Maximum energy loss will take place in a head-on collision with an electron.

Since large angle scattering is rare for positive ions, a range may be well defined for that radiation, depending on its energy and charge, as well as the ionisation energy of the stopping medium. Since the nature of such interactions is statistical, the number of collisions required to bring a radiation particle to rest within the medium will vary slightly with each particle (i.e., some may travel further and undergo fewer collisions than others). Hence, there will be a small variation in the range, known as straggling.

The energy loss per unit distance (and hence, the density of ionization), or stopping power also depends on the type and energy of the particle and on the material. Usually, the energy loss per unit distance increases while the particle slows down. The curve describing this fact is called the Bragg curve. Shortly before the end, the energy loss passes through a maximum, the Bragg peak, and then drops to zero (see the figures in Bragg peak and in stopping power). This fact is of great practical importance for radiation therapy.

The range of alpha particles in ambient air amounts to only several centimeters; this type of radiation can therefore be stopped by a sheet of paper. Although beta particles scatter much more than alpha particles, a range can still be defined; it frequently amounts to several hundred centimeters of air.

The mean range can be calculated by integrating the inverse stopping power over energy.

== Scaling ==
The range of a heavy charged particle is approximately proportional to the mass of the particle and the inverse of the density of the medium, and is a function of the initial velocity of the particle.

== See also ==
- Stopping power (particle radiation)
- Attenuation length
- Radiation length
