= William Henry Bragg =

British X-ray crystallographer (1862–1942)

Sir William Henry Bragg OM KBE FRS
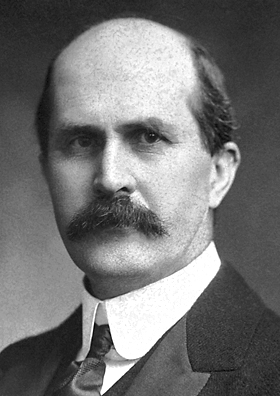
- Bragg in 1915

46th President of the Royal Society
- In office 1935–1940
- Preceded by: Sir Frederick Hopkins
- Succeeded by: Sir Henry Hallett Dale

Personal details
- Born: 2 July 1862 Westward, England
- Died: 12 March 1942 (aged 79) London, England
- Spouse: Gwendoline Todd (m. 1889)
- Children: 3, including Lawrence
- Education: University of Cambridge (BA)
- Known for: Bragg's law
- Awards: Matteucci Medal (1915); Nobel Prize in Physics (1915); Rumford Medal (1916); Copley Medal (1930); Franklin Medal (1930); Faraday Medal (1936); John J. Carty Award for the Advancement of Science (1939)
- Scientific career
- Fields: X-ray crystallography
- Workplaces: University of Adelaide; University of Leeds; University College London; Royal Institution
- Academic advisors: Edward Routh
- Notable students: See list: William Astbury; Kedareswar Banerjee; John Bernal; Lawrence Bragg; John Burton Cleland; Ernest Gordon Cox; Richard Kleeman; Kathleen Lonsdale; John Madsen; Arthur Lindo Patterson; Alexander Rankine; John Monteath Robertson

Signature
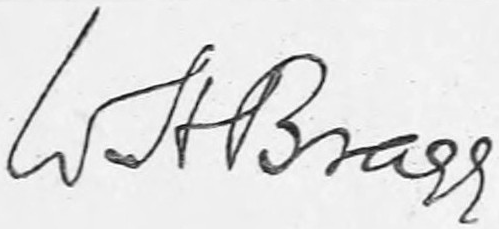

Sir William Henry Bragg (2 July 1862 – 12 March 1942) was a British X-ray crystallographer who uniquely (Note: This is still a unique accomplishment, because no other parent–child duo has yet shared a Nobel Prize in any field. In several cases, a parent won the Prize and the child later won another for separate research. For example, Marie Curie and her daughter Irène Joliot-Curie are the only mother–daughter pair. Several father–son pairs have won two separate Nobel Prizes.) shared a Nobel Prize with his son Lawrence Bragg – the 1915 Nobel Prize in Physics "for their services in the analysis of crystal structure by means of X-rays," an important step in the development of X-ray crystallography.

== Early life and education ==
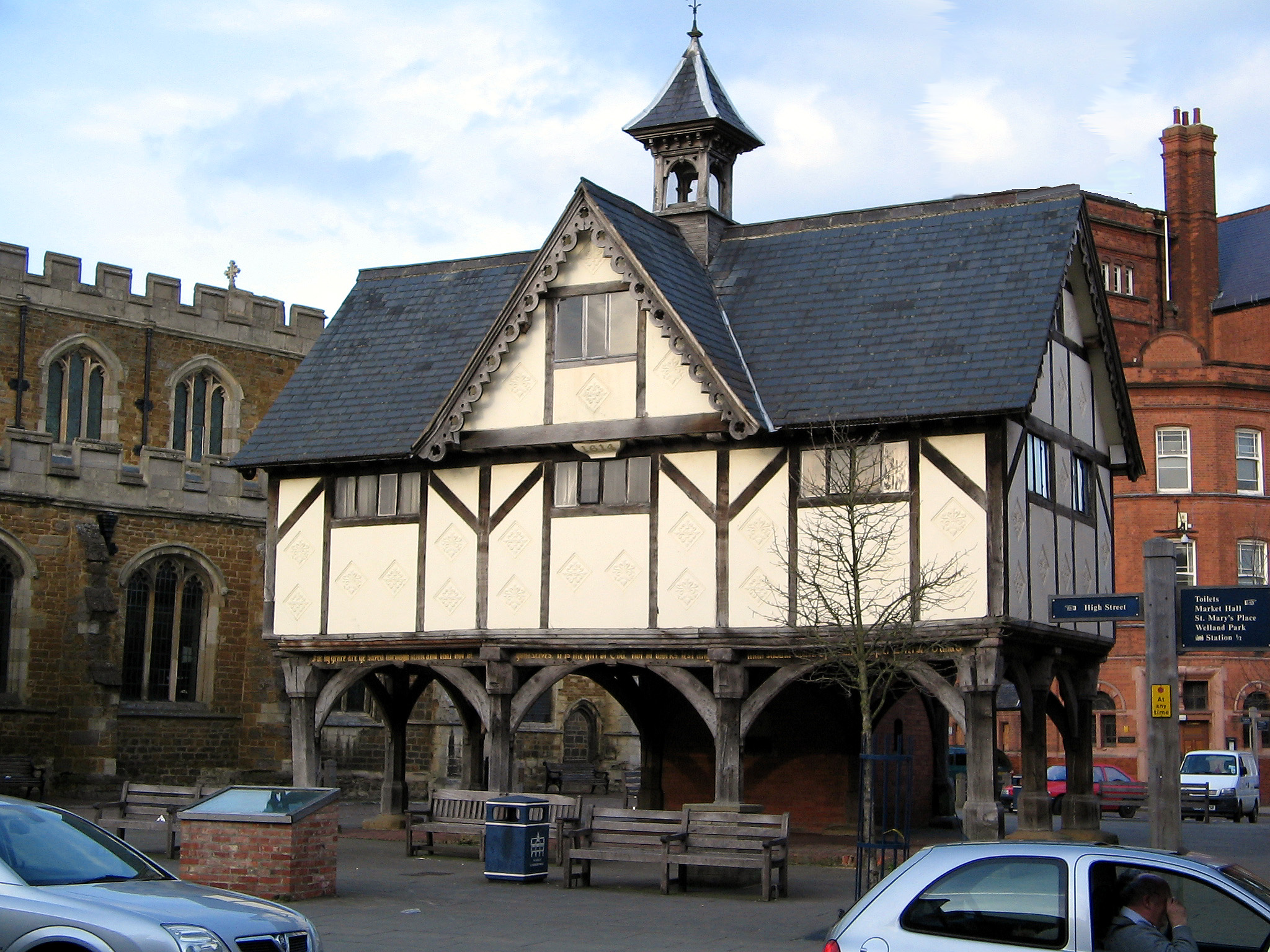
The Old Grammar School, Market Harborough, which has a plaque inside noting Bragg's attendance.

William Henry Bragg was born on 2 July 1862 in Westward, Cumberland, England, the son of Mary (née Wood) and Robert John Bragg, a merchant marine officer and farmer. His mother died when he was age 7, and was raised by his uncle (also named William Bragg) in Market Harborough. He was educated at the Grammar School there, at King William's College on the Isle of Man, and—having won an exhibition—at Trinity College, Cambridge. He graduated in 1884 as Third Wrangler, and earned first-class honours in Part III of the Mathematical Tripos the following year.

== Career and research ==
=== University of Adelaide ===
In 1885, Bragg was appointed Elder Professor of Mathematics and Physics at the University of Adelaide in Australia, and started work there in early 1886. Being a skilled mathematician, at that time he had limited knowledge of physics, most of which was in the form of applied mathematics he had learnt at Trinity College. Also at that time, there were only about a hundred students doing full courses at Adelaide, of whom less than a handful belonged to the science school, whose deficient teaching facilities he improved by apprenticing himself to a firm of instrument makers. He was an able and popular lecturer; he encouraged the formation of the student union, and the attendance, free of charge, of science teachers at his lectures.

Bragg's interest in physics developed, particularly in the field of electromagnetism. In 1895, he was visited by Ernest Rutherford, en route from New Zealand to Cambridge; this was the commencement of a lifelong friendship. He had a keen interest in the new discovery of X-rays by Wilhelm Röntgen. On 29 May 1896 at Adelaide, he demonstrated before a meeting of local doctors the application of "X-rays to reveal structures that were otherwise invisible". Samuel Barbour, senior chemist of F. H. Faulding & Co., an Adelaide pharmaceutical manufacturer, supplied the necessary apparatus in the form of a Crookes tube, a glass discharge tube. The tube had been obtained at Leeds, England, where Barbour visited the firm of Reynolds and Branson, a manufacturer of photographic and laboratory equipment. Barbour returned to Adelaide in April 1896. Barbour had conducted his own experiments shortly after return to Australia, but results were limited due to limited battery power. At the University, the tube was attached to an induction coil and a battery borrowed from Sir Charles Todd, Bragg's father-in-law. The induction coil was utilised to produce the electric spark necessary for Bragg and Barbour to "generate short bursts of X-rays". The audience was favorably impressed. He availed himself as a test subject, in the manner of Röntgen and allowed an X-ray photograph to be taken of his hand. The image of the fingers in his hand revealed "an old injury to one of his fingers sustained when using the turnip chopping machine on his father's farm in Cumbria".

As early as 1895, Bragg was working on wireless telegraphy, though public lectures and demonstrations focussed on his X-ray research which would later lead to his Nobel Prize. In a hurried visit by Rutherford, he was reported as working on a Hertzian oscillator. There were many common practical threads to the two technologies and he was ably assisted in the laboratory by Arthur Lionel Rogers who manufactured much of the equipment. On 21 September 1897 Bragg gave the first recorded public demonstration of the working of wireless telegraphy in Australia during a lecture meeting at the University of Adelaide as part of the Public Teachers' Union conference. Bragg departed Adelaide in December 1897, and spent all of 1898 on a 12-month leave of absence, touring Great Britain and Europe and during this time visited Marconi and inspected his wireless facilities. He returned to Adelaide in early March 1899, and already on 13 May 1899, Bragg and his father-in-law, Sir Charles Todd, were conducting preliminary tests of wireless telegraphy with a transmitter at the Observatory and a receiver on the South Road (about 200 metres). Experiments continued throughout the southern winter of 1899 and the range was progressively extended to Henley Beach. In September the work was extended to two way transmissions with the addition of a second induction coil loaned by Mr. James Oddie of Ballarat. It was desired to extend the experiments cross a sea path and Todd was interested in connecting Cape Spencer and Althorpe Island, but local costs were considered prohibitive while the charges for patented equipment from the Marconi Company were exorbitant. At the same time Bragg's interests were leaning towards X-rays and practical work in wireless in South Australia was largely dormant for the next decade.

The turning-point in Bragg's career came in 1904 when he gave the presidential address to section A of the Australasian Association for the Advancement of Science in Dunedin, New Zealand, on "Some Recent Advances in the Theory of the Ionization of Gases". This idea was followed up "in a brilliant series of researches" which, within three years, earned him a fellowship of the Royal Society of London. This paper was also the origin of his first book Studies in Radioactivity (1912). Soon after the delivery of his 1904 address, some radium bromide was made available to Bragg for experimentation. In December 1904 his paper "On the Absorption of α Rays and on the Classification of the α Rays from Radium" appeared in the Philosophical Magazine, and in the same issue a paper "On the Ionization Curves of Radium", written in collaboration with his student Richard Kleeman, also appeared.

At the end of 1908, Bragg returned to England. During his 23 years in Australia "he had seen the number of students at the University of Adelaide almost quadruple, and had a full share in the development of its excellent science school." He had returned to England on the maiden voyage of the SS Waratah, a ship which vanished at sea on its second voyage the next year. He had been alarmed at the ship's tendency to list during his voyage, and had concluded that the ship's metacentre was just below her centre of gravity. In 1911, he testified his belief that the Waratah was unstable at the Inquiry into the ship's disappearance.

There is a bust of Bragg in North Terrace, Adelaide, South Australia.

=== University of Leeds ===
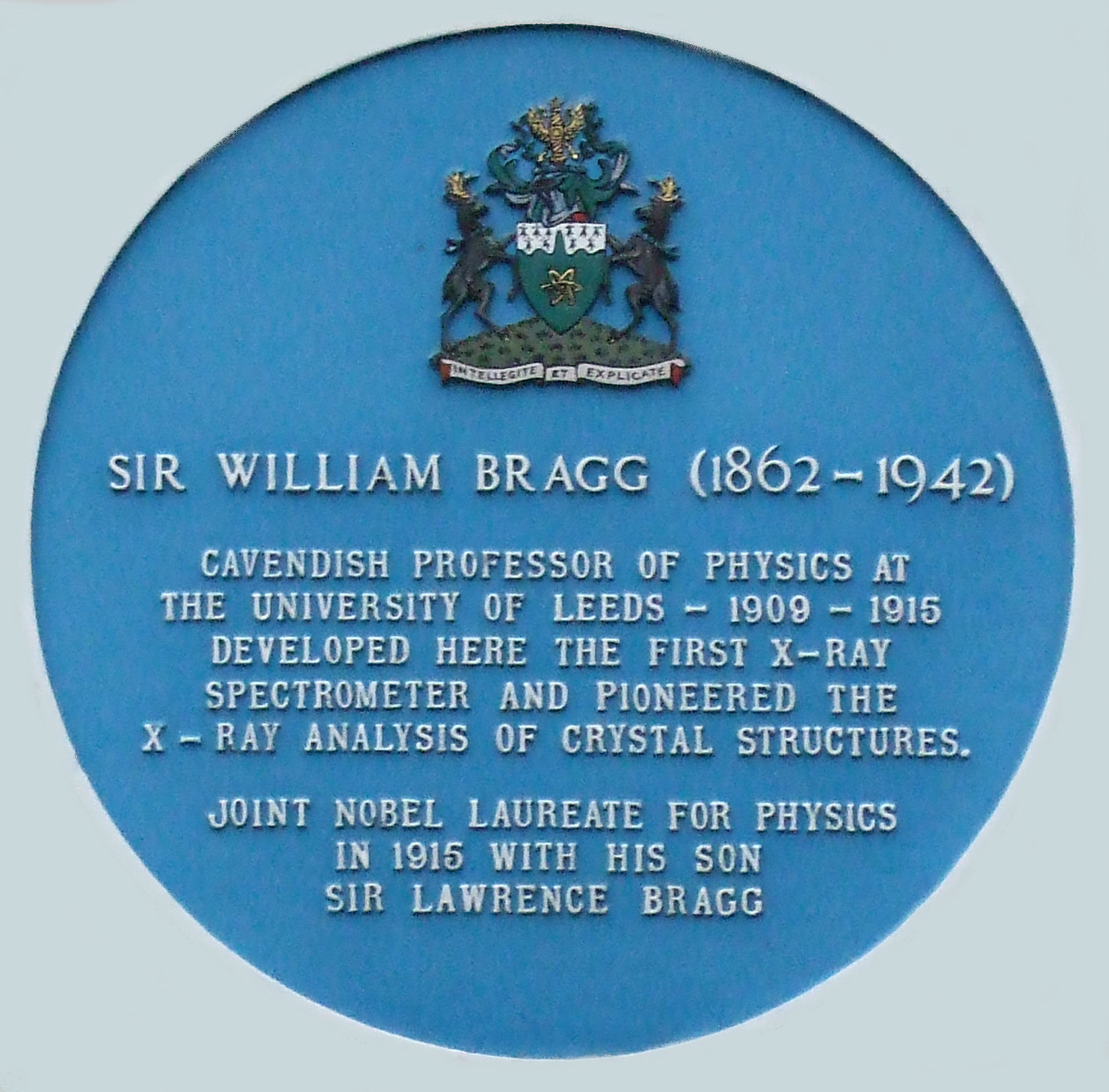
Commemorative plaque on the Parkinson Building, University of Leeds.

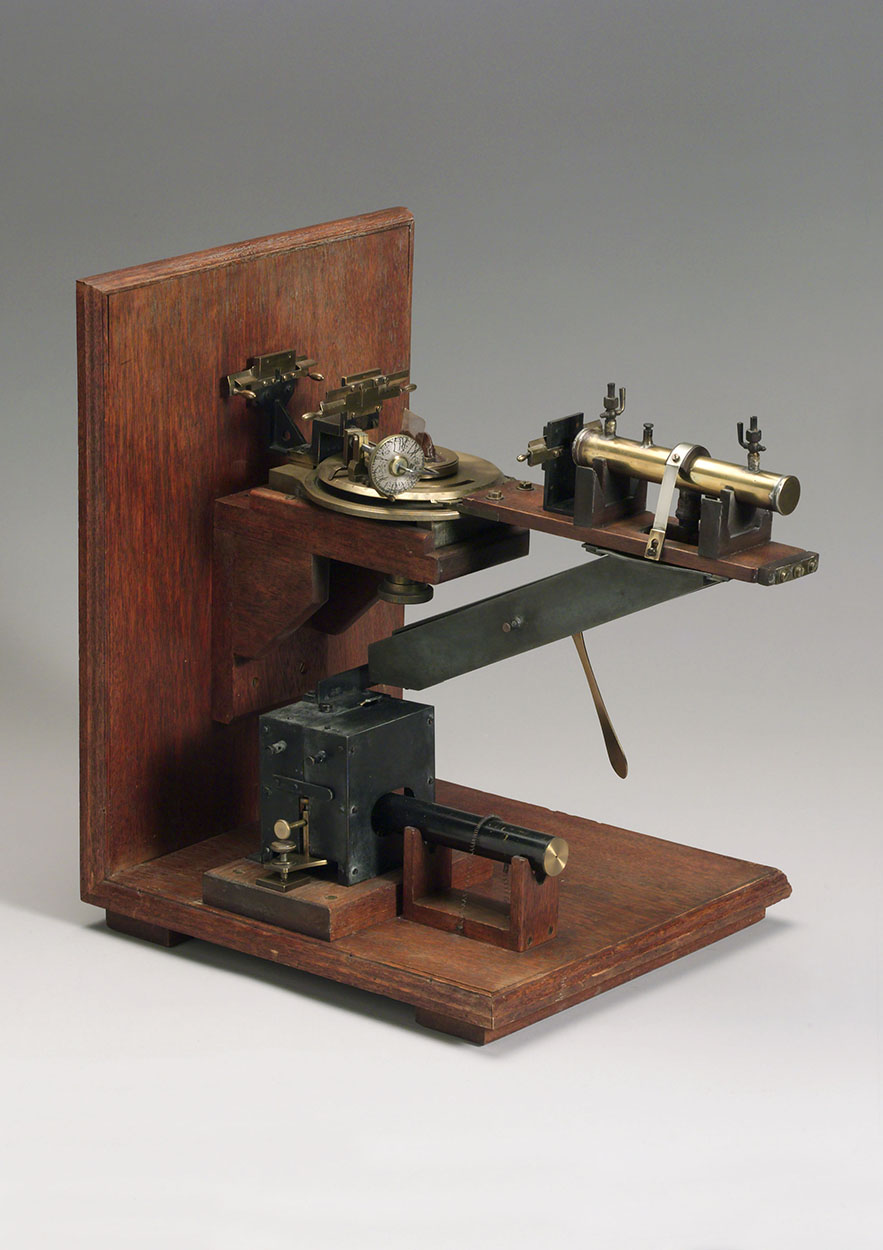
X-ray spectrometer developed by Bragg.

From 1909 to 1915, Bragg was Cavendish Professor of Physics at the University of Leeds. He continued his work on X-rays with much success. He invented the X-ray spectrometer and with his son, Lawrence, then a research student at Cambridge, founded the new science of X-ray crystallography, the analysis of crystal structure using X-ray diffraction.

=== World War I ===
Both of his sons, Lawrence and Robert, were called into the army after the First World War broke out in 1914. The following year, Bragg was appointed Quain Professor of Physics at University College London. He had to wait for almost a year to contribute to the war effort; in July 1915, he was appointed to the Board of Invention and Research set up by the Admiralty. In September, his younger son Robert died of wounds at Gallipoli. In November, he shared the Nobel Prize in Physics with Lawrence. The Navy was struggling to prevent sinkings by unseen, submerged U-boats. The scientists recommended that the best tactic was to listen for the submarines. The Navy had a hydrophone research establishment at Aberdour, Scotland, staffed with navy men. In November 1915, two young physicists were added to its staff. Bowing to outside pressure to use science, in July 1916, the Admiralty appointed Bragg as scientific director at Aberdour, assisted by three additional young physicists. They developed an improved directional hydrophone, which finally convinced the Admiralty of their usefulness. Late in 1916, Bragg with his small group moved to Harwich, where the staff was enlarged and they had access to a submarine for tests. In France, where scientists had been mobilized since the beginning of the war, the physicist Paul Langevin made a major stride with echolocation, generating intense sound pulses with quartz sheets oscillated at high frequency, which were then used as microphones to listen for echoes. Quartz was usable when vacuum tubes became available at the end of 1917 to amplify the faint signals. The British made sonar practicable by using mosaics of small quartz bits rather than slices from a large crystal. In January 1918, Bragg moved into the Admiralty as head of scientific research in the anti-submarine division. By war's end, British vessels were being equipped with sonar manned by trained listeners.

Inspired by Lawrence's methods for locating enemy guns by the sound of their firing, the output from six microphones miles apart along the coast were recorded on moving photographic film. Sound ranging is much more accurate in the sea than in the turbulent atmosphere. They were able to localize the sites of distant explosions, which were used to obtain the precise positions of British warships and of minefields.

After the war, Bragg returned to University College London, where he continued to work on crystal analysis.

=== Royal Institution ===
In 1923, Bragg was appointed Fullerian Professor of Chemistry at the Royal Institution and Director of the Davy Faraday Research Laboratory. This institution was practically rebuilt in 1929–1930 and, under Bragg's directorship, many valuable papers were issued from the laboratory. In 1919, 1923, 1925, and 1931, he was invited to deliver the Royal Institution Christmas Lecture on The World of Sound; Concerning the Nature of Things, Old Trades and New Knowledge and The Universe of Life respectively.

=== Royal Society and World War II ===
In 1935, Bragg was elected President of the Royal Society. The physiologist A. V. Hill was biological secretary and soon A. C. G. Egerton became physical secretary. During World War I, all three had stood by for frustrating months before their skills were employed for the war effort. Now the cause of science was strengthened by the report of a high-level Army committee on lessons learned in the last war; their first recommendation was to "keep abreast of modern scientific developments". Anticipating another war, the Ministry of Labour was persuaded to accept Hill as a consultant on scientific manpower. The Royal Society compiled a register of qualified men. They proposed a small committee on science to advise the Committee on Imperial Defence, but this was rejected. Finally in 1940, as his term ended, a scientific advisory committee to the War Cabinet was appointed. He was among the 2,300 names of prominent persons listed on the Nazis' Black Book, of those who were to be arrested on the invasion of Great Britain and turned over to the Gestapo.

== Personal life and death ==
In 1889, in Adelaide, Bragg married Gwendoline Todd, a skilled water-colour painter and the daughter of astronomer Charles Todd. They had three children; Gwendolen, Lawrence, and Robert. Gwendolen married architect Alban Caroe. Bragg taught Lawrence at the University of Adelaide, and Robert was killed in the Battle of Gallipoli.

Bragg played tennis and golf, and as a founding member of the North Adelaide and Adelaide University lacrosse clubs, contributed to the introduction of lacrosse to South Australia. He was also the Secretary of the Adelaide University Chess Association.

Bragg died of heart failure on 12 March 1942 in London at the age of 79.

== Recognition ==
=== Memberships ===
Year	Organisation	Type	Ref.
1907	Royal Society	Fellow	
1939	National Academy of Sciences	International Member	
1940	American Philosophical Society	International Member	

=== Awards ===
Year	Organisation	Award	Citation	Ref.
1915	Accademia dei XL	Matteucci Medal	—	
1915	Royal Swedish Academy of Sciences	Nobel Prize in Physics	"For their [William and Lawrence Bragg] services in the analysis of crystal structure by means of X-rays."	
1916	Royal Society	Rumford Medal	"On the ground[s] of his researches in X-ray radiation."	
1930	Royal Society	Copley Medal	"For his distinguished contributions to crystallography and radioactivity."	
1930	Franklin Institute	Franklin Medal	"For the development of method of determining molecular and crystal structure by reflection of X-rays."	
1936	Institution of Electrical Engineers	Faraday Medal	—	
1939	National Academy of Sciences	John J. Carty Award for the Advancement of Science	—	

=== Honours ===
Year	Country	Honour	Ref.
1920	United Kingdom	Knight Commander of the Order of the British Empire	
1931	United Kingdom	Order of Merit	

== Commemoration ==
The Electoral district of Bragg in the South Australian House of Assembly was created in 1970, and was named after both William and Lawrence Bragg. Bragg crater on the Moon was named in his honour in 1970.

The lecture theatre of King William's College (KWC) is named in memory of Bragg; the Sixth-Form invitational literary debating society at KWC, the Bragg Society, is also named in his memory. One of the school "Houses" at Robert Smyth School, Market Harborough, Leicester, is named "Bragg" in memory of him being a student there. Since 1992, the Australian Institute of Physics has awarded the Bragg Gold Medal for excellence in physics for the best PhD thesis by a student at an Australian university. The two sides of the medal contain the images of Sir William Henry and his son Sir Lawrence Bragg.

The Experimental Technique Centre at Brunel University is named the Bragg Building. The Sir William Henry Bragg Building at the University of Leeds opened in 2021.

In 1962, the Bragg Laboratories were constructed at the University of Adelaide to commemorate 100 years since the birth of Sir William H. Bragg.

The Australian Bragg Centre for Proton Therapy and Research also in Adelaide, Australia was completed in late 2023. It is named for both father and son and offers radiation therapy for cancer patients.

In August 2013, Bragg's relative, the broadcaster Melvyn Bragg, presented a BBC Radio 4 programme "Bragg on the Braggs" on the 1915 Nobel Prize in Physics winners.

== Publications ==
- William Henry Bragg, William Lawrence Bragg, "X Rays and Crystal Structure", G. Bell & Son, London, 1915.
- William Henry Bragg, The World of Sound (1920)
- William Henry Bragg, The Crystalline State – The Romanes Lecture for 1925. Oxford, 1925.
- William Henry Bragg, Concerning the Nature of Things (1925)
- William Henry Bragg, Old Trades and New Knowledge (1926)
- William Henry Bragg, An Introduction to Crystal Analysis (1928)
- William Henry Bragg, The Universe of Light (1933)

== See also ==
- George Gamow – has 1931 photograph with Bragg, location unspecified.
- List of Nobel laureates in Physics
- List of presidents of the Royal Society

== Notes ==
Professional and academic associations
Preceded by Frederick Gowland Hopkins	46th President of the Royal Society; 1935–1940	Succeeded by Henry Hallett Dale
